= Government of Nazi Germany =

Government of the German Reich

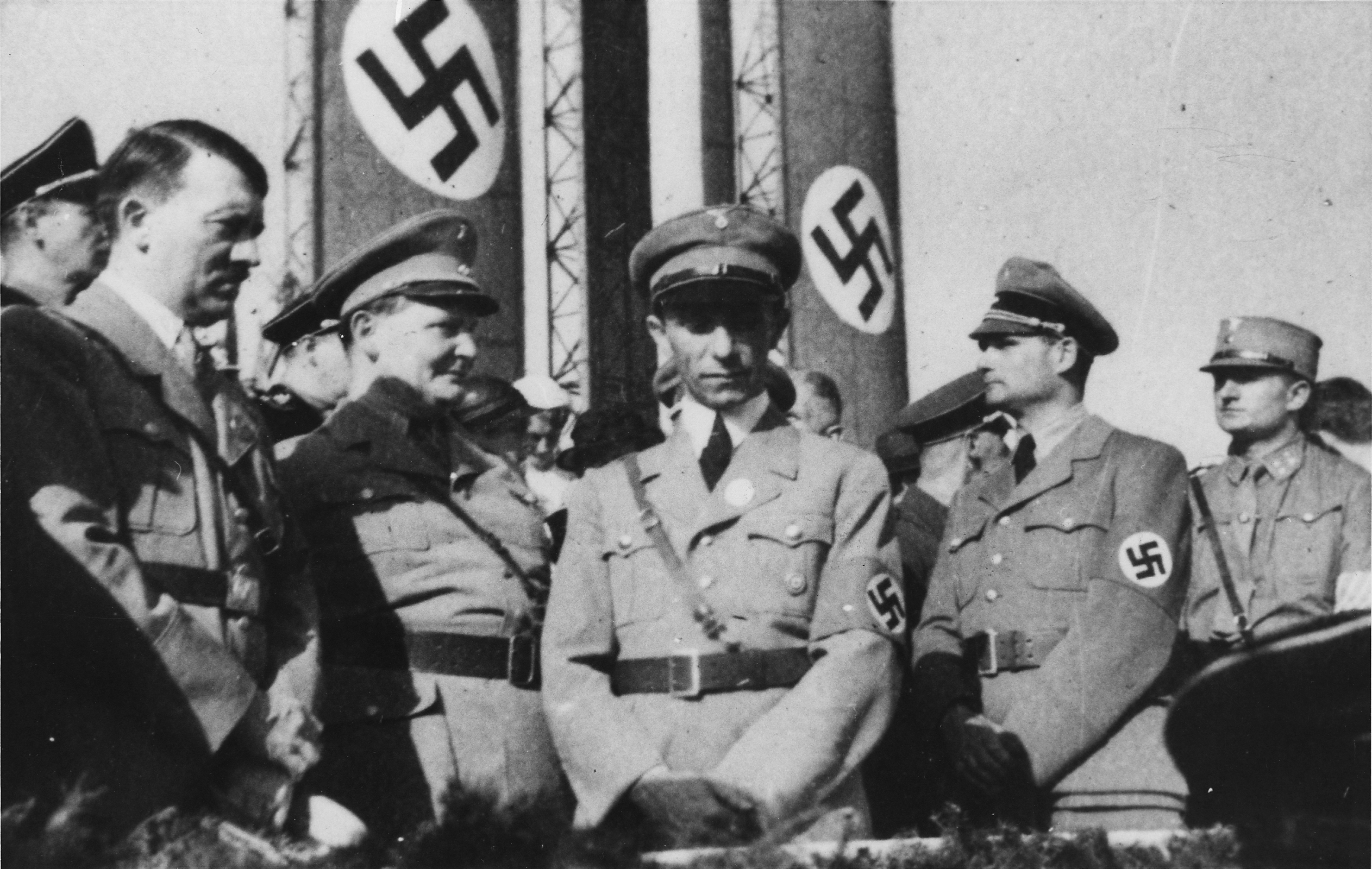
- From left to right: Adolf Hitler, Hermann Göring, Joseph Goebbels and Rudolf Hess, 1933
- Date formed: 30 January 1933; 93 years ago
- Date dissolved: 5 June 1945; 81 years ago

People and organisations
- Reichspräsident: Paul von Hindenburg; Adolf Hitler (as Führer); Karl Dönitz
- Reichskanzler: Adolf Hitler; Joseph Goebbels; Lutz Graf Schwerin von Krosigk
- No. of ministers: 44 (Hitler cabinet); 17 (Goebbels cabinet); 7 (Schwerin von Krosigk cabinet)
- Status in legislature: Großdeutscher Reichstag (until 1934, then used for meeting purposes)

History
- Elections: March 1933 (8th Reichstag); November 1933 (9th Reichstag); 1934 referendum (merger of the positions of Chancellor and President); March 1936 (10th Reichstag); April 1938 (11th Reichstag)
- Predecessor: Government of the Weimar Republic
- Successor: Allied Control Council

The government of Nazi Germany (formally the government of the German Reich; German: Regierung des Deutschen Reiches) was a totalitarian dictatorship governed by Adolf Hitler and the Nazi Party according to the Führerprinzip. Nazi Germany was established in January 1933 with the appointment of Adolf Hitler as Chancellor of Germany, followed by the suspension of basic rights with the Reichstag Fire Decree and the Enabling Act which gave Hitler's regime the power to pass and enforce laws without the involvement of the Reichstag or German president, and de facto ended with Germany's surrender in World War II on 8 May 1945 and de jure ended with the Berlin Declaration on 5 June 1945.

As the successor to the government of the Weimar Republic, it inherited the governmental structure and institutions of the previous state. Although the Weimar Constitution technically remained in effect until the German surrender, there were no actual restraints on the exercise of state power. In addition to the already extant Weimar government, the Nazi leadership created a large number of different organizations for the purpose of helping them govern and remain in power. They pursued a policy of rearmament and strengthened the Wehrmacht, established an extensive national security apparatus and created the Waffen-SS, the combat branch of the Schutzstaffel (SS).

The government of Nazi Germany had centralised powers, abolished the previous federal system that the Weimar Republic had established, and violated the sovereignty of states while it was active.

== Working towards the Führer ==
On 30 January 1933, President Paul von Hindenburg appointed Hitler as Chancellor of Germany. This event is known as the Machtergreifung ('seizure of power'). In the following months, the Nazi Party used a process termed Gleichschaltung (co-ordination) to rapidly bring all aspects of life under control of the party. All civilian organisations, including agricultural groups, volunteer organisations, and sports clubs, had their leadership replaced with Nazi sympathisers or party members. By July 1933, all other political parties had been banned or had dissolved themselves, and the Law Against the Formation of Parties declared the Nazis the only legal party. Virtually the only organisations not controlled by the Nazi Party were the army and the churches. When President Hindenburg died in August 1934, the Law Concerning the Head of State of the German Reich merged the offices of Reich President and Chancellor and conferred the position on Hitler, who thus also became head of state and Supreme Commander of the Armed Forces. By 1939, party membership was compulsory for all civil service officials. Hitler ruled Germany autocratically by asserting the Führerprinzip ('leader principle'), which called for absolute obedience of all subordinates. He viewed the government structure as a pyramid, with himself at the apex. Rank in the party was not determined by elections; positions were filled through appointment by those of higher rank. The Nazi Party used propaganda to develop a cult of personality around Hitler.

Top officials reported to Hitler and followed his policies, but they had considerable autonomy. Officials were expected to "work towards the Führer" – to take the initiative in promoting policies and actions in line with his wishes and the goals of the Nazi Party, without Hitler having to be involved in the day-to-day running of the country. He often deferred making decisions, avoided clear delegation and allowed subordinates to compete with one another, especially in the pre-war years. The government was not a coordinated, co-operating body, but rather a disorganised collection of factions led by members of the party elite who struggled to amass power and gain the Führer's favour.

The system of government was formed whereby leading Nazi officials were forced to interpret Hitler's speeches, remarks and writings on government policies and turn them into programs and legislation. Hitler typically did not give written orders; instead he communicated them verbally, or had them conveyed through his close associate, Martin Bormann. He entrusted Bormann with his paperwork, appointments, and personal finances; Bormann used his position to control the flow of information and access to Hitler. Hitler's cabinet never met after 1938, and he discouraged his ministers from meeting independently.

Hitler's leadership style was to give contradictory orders to his subordinates and to place them into positions where their duties and responsibilities overlapped with those of others, to have "the stronger one [do] the job". In this way, Hitler fostered distrust, competition, and infighting among his subordinates to consolidate and maximise his own power.

The process allowed more unscrupulous and ambitious Nazis to get away with implementing the more radical and extreme elements of Hitler's ideology, such as antisemitism, and in doing so win political favour. It was protected by Joseph Goebbels' effective propaganda machine, which portrayed Hitler as a heroic and infallible leader. Further, the government was portrayed as a dedicated, dutiful and efficient outfit. Through successive Reichsstatthalter decrees, Germany's states were effectively replaced by Nazi provinces called Gaue.

After June 1941 as World War II progressed, Hitler became preoccupied with military matters and spent most of his time at his military headquarters on the eastern front. This led Hitler to rely more and more on Bormann to handle the domestic policies of the country. On 12 April 1943, Hitler officially appointed Bormann as Personal Secretary to the Führer. By this time Bormann had de facto control over all domestic matters, and this new appointment gave him the power to act in an official capacity in any matter.

Historical opinion is divided between "intentionalists" who believe that Hitler created this system as the only means of ensuring both the total loyalty and dedication of his supporters, and the impossibility of a conspiracy; and the "structuralists" who believe that the system evolved by itself and was a limitation on Hitler's totalitarian power.

The organization of the Nazi state was as follows:

== Chancelleries and other national authorities ==
- Reich Chancellery (Hans Lammers)
- Presidential Chancellery (Otto Meissner)
- Party Chancellery (Martin Bormann)
- Chancellery of the Führer (Philipp Bouhler)
- Council of Ministers for the Defense of the Reich (Hermann Göring)
- Secret Cabinet Council (Konstantin von Neurath)

== Cabinet ministries ==
- Foreign Office (Konstantin von Neurath, Joachim von Ribbentrop, Arthur Seyss-Inquart, Lutz Schwerin von Krosigk)
- Interior Ministry (Wilhelm Frick, Heinrich Himmler, Paul Giesler, Wilhelm Stuckart)
- Ministry of Finance (Lutz Schwerin von Krosigk)
- Ministry of Justice (Franz Gürtner, Franz Schlegelberger, Otto Georg Thierack, Herbert Klemm)
- Ministry of War (Werner von Blomberg, Karl Dönitz)
- Ministry for Economics (Alfred Hugenberg, Kurt Schmitt, Hjalmar Schacht, Hermann Göring, Walther Funk, Albert Speer)
- Ministry of Food and Agriculture (Alfred Hugenberg, Richard Walther Darré, Herbert Backe)
- Labor Ministry (Franz Seldte, Theo Hupfauer)
- Postal Ministry (Paul Freiherr von Eltz-Rübenach, Wilhelm Ohnesorge, Julius Dorpmüller)
- Ministry of Transport (Paul Freiherr von Eltz-Rübenach, Julius Dorpmüller)
  - Commission for Ocean Navigation (Karl Kaufmann)
- Ministry for Public Enlightenment and Propaganda (Joseph Goebbels, Werner Naumann)
  - Reich Chamber of Culture
    - Reich Cultural Senate
- Ministry of Aviation (Hermann Göring)
- Ministry of Science, Education and Culture (Bernhard Rust, Gustav Adolf Scheel, Wilhelm Stuckart)
- Ministry for Church Affairs (Hanns Kerrl, Hermann Muhs)
- Ministry of Armaments and War Production (Fritz Todt, Albert Speer, Karl Saur)
- Ministry for the Occupied Eastern Territories (Alfred Rosenberg)
- Ministers without Portfolio (Hermann Göring, Ernst Röhm, Rudolf Hess, Hanns Kerrl, Hans Frank, Hjalmar Schacht, Hans Lammers, Konstantin von Neurath, Arthur Seyss-Inquart, Wilhelm Frick & Konstantin Hierl)

== Reich offices ==
- General Building Councillor for the Capital of the Movement (Hermann Giesler)
- General Building Inspector of the Reich Capital (Albert Speer)
- Office of the Four Year Plan (Hermann Göring)
  - General Plenipotentiary for Labor Deployment (Fritz Sauckel)
- Forestry Office (Hermann Göring)
- Inspector General for German Roadways (Fritz Todt, Albert Speer)
- Organisation Todt (Fritz Todt, Albert Speer, Franz Xaver Dorsch)
- Inspector General for Water and Energy (Fritz Todt, Albert Speer)
- Reich Commissioner for Employment Creation (Günther Gereke)
- Reich Commissioner for the Consolidation of German Nationhood (Heinrich Himmler)
- Reich Labour Service (RAD – Reichsarbeitsdienst) (Konstantin Hierl)
- Reichsbank (Hjalmar Schacht, Walther Funk)
- Reichsnährstand (Richard Walther Darré)

== State and provincial administrators ==
- Reichsstatthalter of German States
- Oberpräsidenten of Prussian provinces

== Occupation authorities ==
- Protectorate of Bohemia and Moravia (Konstantin von Neurath, Wilhelm Frick)
  - Deputy Protector of Bohemia and Moravia (Reinhard Heydrich, Kurt Daluege)
  - Minister of State (Karl Hermann Frank)
- General Government of Poland (Hans Frank)
  - Deputy Governor-General (Arthur Seyss-Inquart, Josef Bühler)
- Reichskommissariat for the Occupied Norwegian Territories (Josef Terboven)
- Reichskommissariat for the Occupied Dutch Territories (Arthur Seyss-Inquart)
- Reichskommissariat of Belgium and Northern France (Josef Grohé)
- Reichskommissariat Ostland (Hinrich Lohse, Erich Koch)
- Reichskommissariat Ukraine (Erich Koch)
- Office of the Military Governor of France (Otto von Stülpnagel, Carl-Heinrich von Stülpnagel)
- Civil Administration Area of Alsace (Robert Wagner)
- Civil Administration Area of Lorraine (Josef Bürckel, Willi Stöhr)
- Civil Administration Area of Luxembourg (Gustav Simon)
- Civil Administration Area of Lower Styria (Siegfried Uiberreither)
- Civil Administration Area of Upper Carniola (Friedrich Rainer)
- Civil Administration Area of Bialystok District (Erich Koch)

== Legislative branch ==
- Reichstag
  - President of the Reichstag (Hermann Göring)
  - First Deputy President (Hanns Kerrl)
- Reichsrat (disbanded on 14 February 1934 by the "Law on the Abolition of the Reichsrat")

It has to be considered that there is little use talking about a legislative branch in a totalitarian state, where there is no separation of powers. Since passage of the Enabling Act, the Reichsregierung ('Reich cabinet') was empowered to enact Reichsgesetze ('statute law') without respect to the 1919 constitution.

== Judicial system ==
Most of the judicial structures and legal codes of the Weimar Republic remained in use during the Nazi era, but significant changes within the judicial codes occurred, as well as significant changes in court rulings. Most human rights of the constitution of the Weimar Republic were disabled by several Reichsgesetze ('Reich's laws'). Several minorities, opposition politicians and prisoners of war were deprived of most of their rights and responsibilities. The plan to pass a Volksstrafgesetzbuch ('people's code of criminal justice') arose soon after 1933 but didn't come into reality until the end of World War II.

As a new type of court, the Volksgerichtshof ('people's court') was established in 1934, only dealing with cases of political importance. In practice, it served only as a kangaroo court, conducting show trials that gave the appearance of legal process while handing down harsh sentences to political enemies. From 1934 to 1945, the court sentenced 10,980 people to prison and imposed the death penalty on 5,179 more who were convicted of high treason. About 1,000 were acquitted. Its most prominent members were Otto Georg Thierack, president of the court from May 1936 to August 1942, and Roland Freisler, who presided from August 1942 to February 1945. After the war ended, some surviving jurists were tried, convicted, and sentenced as war criminals.

== Military organizations ==
The Nazi war flag and Ensign of the Kriegsmarine

- Wehrmacht – Armed Forces

OKW – Armed Forces High Command

Chief of the Supreme Command of the Armed Forces

Field Marshal Wilhelm Keitel (1938 to 1945)
Colonel General Alfred Jodl (May 1945)

Chief of the Operations Staff

Colonel General Alfred Jodl (1939 to 1945)

Chief of Military Intelligence (Abwehr)

Rear Admiral Konrad Patzig (1932 to 1935)
Vice Admiral Wilhelm Canaris (1935 to 1944)

- Heer – Army

OKH – Army High Command

Army Commanders-in-Chief

Colonel General Werner von Fritsch (1935 to 1938)
Field Marshal Walther von Brauchitsch (1938 to 1941)
Führer and Reich Chancellor Adolf Hitler (1941 to 1945)
Field Marshal Ferdinand Schörner (April to May 1945)

- Kriegsmarine – Navy

OKM – Navy High Command

Navy Commanders-in-Chief

Grand Admiral Erich Raeder (1928 to 1943)
Grand Admiral Karl Dönitz (1943 to 1945)
General Admiral Hans-Georg von Friedeburg (May 1945)
General Admiral Walter Warzecha (May to July 1945)

- Luftwaffe – Air Force

OKL – Air Force High Command

Air Force Commanders-in-Chief

Reich Marshal Hermann Göring (1935 to 1945)
Field Marshal Robert Ritter von Greim (April to May 1945)

== Paramilitary organizations ==
- Sturmabteilung (SA) (Ernst Röhm, Viktor Lutze, Wilhelm Schepmann)
- Schutzstaffel (SS) (Heinrich Himmler, Karl Hanke)
  - Allgemeine SS ('General SS')
  - SS-Totenkopfverbände (SS-TV)
  - SS-Verfügungstruppe (SS-VT) Nazi Party troops, forerunner to the Waffen-SS
  - Waffen-SS ('Armed SS') – Nazi Party military branch from 1940, forward (Hans Jüttner)
- National Socialist Motor Corps (Nationalsozialistisches Kraftfahrerkorps – NSKK) (Adolf Hühnlein, Erwin Kraus)
- National Socialist Flyers Corps (Nationalsozialistisches Fliegerkorps – NSFK) (Friedrich Christiansen, Alfred Keller)
- Volkssturm ('People's Storm')

== National police agencies ==
- Chief of the German Police (Chef der Deutschen Polizei) Heinrich Himmler, Karl Hanke
- Reich Security Main Office (RSHA – Reichssicherheitshauptamt) Reinhard Heydrich, Ernst Kaltenbrunner
  - Security Service (Sicherheitsdienst – SD) Reinhard Heydrich, Ernst Kaltenbrunner
  - Security Police (Sicherheitspolizei – SiPo) Reinhard Heydrich
    - Secret State Police (Geheime Staatspolizei – Gestapo) Reinhard Heydrich, Heinrich Müller
    - Criminal Police (Kriminalpolizei – Kripo) Arthur Nebe, Friedrich Panzinger
- Order Police (Ordnungspolizei – Orpo) Kurt Daluege, Alfred Wünnenberg
  - Schutzpolizei (Schupo – State Police)
  - Gemeindepolizei (GemPo – Local Police)
  - Gendarmerie ('Rural Police')
  - Feuerschutzpolizei ('Fire Protection Police')
- Customs Border Guards (Zollgrenzschutz – ZGS)

== Political and youth organizations ==
- Nazi Party – National Socialist German Workers’ Party (abbreviated NSDAP)
  - Führer (Adolf Hitler)
  - Deputy Führer (to 1941; Rudolf Hess)
  - Party Treasurer (Franz Xaver Schwarz)
  - Supreme Party Judge (Walter Buch)
  - Reichsleiter
  - Gauleiter
- Nazi Party offices
  - Rassenpolitisches Amt der NSDAP – Office of Racial Policy (Walter Gross)
  - Außenpolitische Amt der NSDAP – Office of Foreign Affairs (Alfred Rosenberg)
  - Kolonialpolitisches Amt der NSDAP – Office of Colonial Policy
  - Wehrpolitisches Amt der NSDAP – Office of Military Policy (Franz Ritter von Epp)
  - Amt Rosenberg – Rosenberg Office (Alfred Rosenberg)
- Ahnenerbe – List of Ahnenerbe institutes
- German Labour Front (Robert Ley)
  - National Socialist Factory Cell Organization (Walter Schuhmann)
  - Strength Through Joy (Robert Ley)
- National Socialist Women's League (Gertrud Scholtz-Klink)
- Youth organizations of Nazi Germany
  - Hitler-Jugend – Hitler Youth (for boys ages 14–18) (Baldur von Schirach, Artur Axmann)
  - Deutsches Jungvolk (for boys ages 10–14)
  - Faith and Beauty Society (For young women ages 17–21)
  - Bund Deutscher Mädel (for girls ages 14–17)
  - Jungmädelbund (for girls ages 10–14)

== Service organizations ==
- Deutsche Reichsbahn ('State Railway') (Julius Dorpmüller)
- Deutsches Rotes Kreuz (DRK – German Red Cross) (Charles Edward, Duke of Saxe-Coburg and Gotha)
- National Socialist People's Welfare (Erich Hilgenfeldt)
- NS-Reichskriegerbund Kyffhäuser (National Socialist Reich War Veterans League Kyffhäuser) (Wilhelm Reinhard)
- Reichsluftschutzbund (RLB – Air Defence League)
- Reichspost (State Postal Service) (Wilhelm Ohnesorge)
- Technische Nothilfe (TENO – Technical Emergency Corps)

== Religious organizations ==
- German Christians (movement) (Ludwig Müller)
- German Evangelical Church (Ludwig Müller)
- German Faith Movement

== Academic and professional organizations ==
- Academy for German Law (Hans Frank, Otto Georg Thierack)
- National Socialist Association of Legal Professionals (Hans Frank, Otto Georg Thierack)
- National Socialist Civil Servants League (Hermann Neef)
- National Socialist German Doctors' League (Gerhard Wagner, Leonardo Conti)
- National Socialist German Lecturers League (Walter Schultze, Gustav Adolf Scheel)
- National Socialist German Students' League (Baldur von Schirach, Gustav Adolf Scheel)
- National Socialist Teachers League (Hans Schemm, Fritz Wachtler)
