= Jakob Nagel =

German engineer and civil servant (1899–1973)

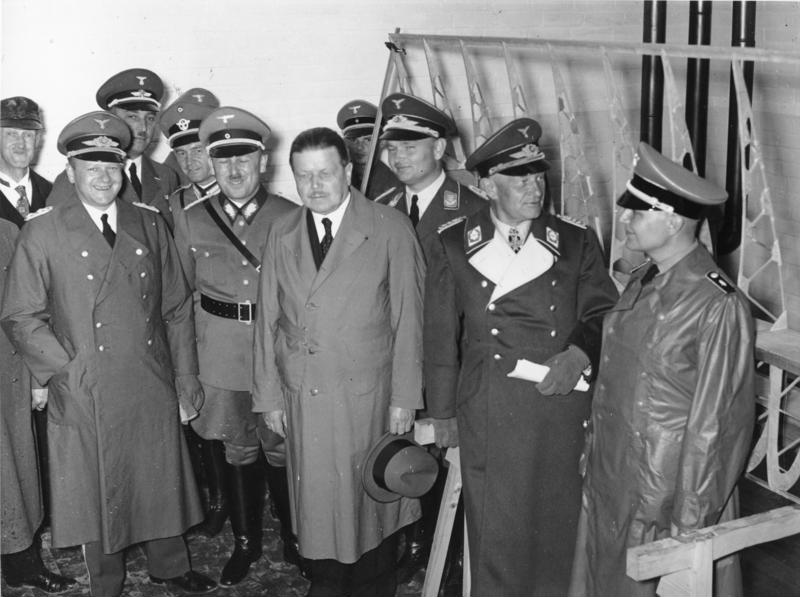
- Nagel in 1937 (fifth from left, next to Wilhelm Ohnesorge, in civilian attire)

State Secretary Reich Postal Ministry
- In office 22 February 1937 – 23 May 1945
- Preceded by: Wilhelm Ohnesorge
- Succeeded by: Position abolished

Personal details
- Born: 2 October 1899 Oberlandau, Rhenish Palatinate, German Empire
- Died: 14 January 1973 (aged 73) Nuremberg, Bavaria, West Germany
- Party: Nazi Party
- Education: Technische Hochschule Karlsruhe; Technische Hochschule zu Berlin
- Profession: Electrical engineer

Military service
- Allegiance: German Empire
- Branch/service: Bavarian Army
- Years of service: 1917–1918
- Unit: Signal Detachment 2
- Battles/wars: World War I
- Awards: Knight's Cross of the War Merit Cross

Jakob Nagel (2 October 1899 – 14 January 1973) was a German electrical engineer and civil servant. He became a member of the Nazi Party and, from 1937 to 1945, he served as the state secretary of the Reich Postal Ministry. He also held the honorary ranks of NSKK-Gruppenführer in the National Socialist Motor Corps and SS-Obersturmbannführer in the Schutzstaffel (SS). After World War II, he emigrated to Argentina for several years before returning to Germany and working as an executive in the telecommunications industry.

== Early life and education ==
Nagel was born in 1899 at Oberlustadt, the son of a Deutsche Reichspost rural mail carrier. He attended the Realschule in Landau in der Pfalz until 1916 and, lacking the funds to continue his education, entered the workforce. In November 1917, during World War I, he was conscripted as a telephone operator into the Bavarian Army's Signal Corps, and was attached to Signal Detachment 2.

Following the end of the war, Nagel spent a year at the Oberrealschule in Ludwigshafen and passed the Notabitur, the wartime substitute matriculation exam, in December 1919. He then attended the Technische Hochschule Karlsruhe (today, the Technical University of Karlsruhe), and graduated in November 1923 with an electrical engineering degree (Diplom-Ingenieur). During his university and post-graduate studies, he became a Corps student of the Burschenschaft Vitruvia Karlsruhe in 1921, and of the Karlsruher Burschenschaft Tuiskonia in 1930.

== Career in the Weimar Republic ==
Starting in May 1924, Nagel spent a year working for the electrical equipment company AEG in Berlin as an engineer for electric railways. In May 1925, he entered the Reichspost as a postal civil servant at the Karlsruhe Regional Postal Directorate. In March 1927, he transferred as a manager to the Reichspostzentralamt, the central office in Berlin. Under Reichspost President Wilhelm Ohnesorge, he initially served as head of the research and development department for telephony, telegraphy and radio, as well as for technical quality control. At the beginning of 1931, he became the telegraph director at the Berlin Long-Distance Exchange, which was then one of the largest telephone exchanges in the world.

== Career in Nazi Germany ==
In August 1932, Nagel joined the Nazi Party (membership number 1,277,955). In March 1933, shortly after the Nazi seizure of power, Ohnesorge was named state secretary at the Reich Postal Ministry, and Nagel accompanied him as his personal assistant. He initially held the rank of Postrat (postal councilor), and shortly thereafter, Oberpostrat (senior postal councilor). In April 1934, he was promoted to Ministerialrat (ministerial councilor), and from 1935, he headed Department IV (Personnel Affairs) with the rank of Ministerialdirektor. During this period, he authored a number of articles and a book on the postal service's personnel policies between 1933 and 1937.

=== State Secretary ===
Following Ohnesorge's appointment to Adolf Hitler's cabinet as the Reich postal minister, Nagel succeeded him on 22 February 1937 as the permanent state secretary. Ohnesorge created a new Central Ministerial Department that reported directly to him to handle all political matters; the other departments within the ministry were thereby "reduced to mere technical departments". As a result, Nagel possessed "no scope whatsoever to shape policy". In addition, Ohnesorge issued an internal directive that removed Nagel from the state secretary’s customary role as the minister's deputy. Instead, Nagel took charge of Department V (Budget, Finance, Cash and Accounting, Postal Cheques and Postal Construction Services). He was also given oversight of the Kraftpost, the motorized postal transport, as well as the civilian leadership of the Postschutz, the postal protection service.

In April 1938, due to the collaboration between the Reich Postal Service and the National Socialist Motor Corps (NSKK) in the fields of motor transport and traffic, the Berlin Motor Group granted Nagel the honorary rank of NSKK-Standartenführer; this was followed by NSKK-Oberführer in 1939, NSKK-Brigadeführer shortly thereafter, and NSKK-Gruppenführer in 1943. In June 1941, Nagel earned his engineering doctorate (Doktoringenieur) from the Technische Hochschule zu Berlin (today, the Technische Universität Berlin). The same year, he also launched the publication of the journal Der Fernmelde-Ingenieur (The Telecommunications Engineer), which provided training and professional development of postal telecommunications engineers. The journal was published until its temporary suspension in 1944. In March 1942, in the midst of World War II, the Postschutz was placed under the command of the Schutzstaffel (SS). Consequently, Nagel and other ministerial officials became members of the SS. He initially received the rank of SS-Sturmbannführer, and a year later, that of SS-Obersturmbannführer.

At the end of 1944, Nagel had to vacate Department V in favor of Ministerialdirektor and SS-Brigadeführer Willi Köhn, whose previous Department East had lost significant importance due to the advance of the Red Army. In February 1945, Nagel was awarded the Knight's Cross of the War Merit Cross in recognition of his service to the communications sector during the war. In March 1945, he withheld implementation of the Nero Decree, which mandated the destruction of the Reich Postal Service's radio and telecommunications facilities upon the advance of the Allies. His actions ensured that most of the facilities remained intact for the post-war period. As the Allied forces threatened to cut Germany in half, it was decided to split the government ministries into a northern working group in Schleswig-Holstein and a southern working group at the planned Alpine Fortress. On 9 April 1945, the Reichspost's southern group in Kelheim was placed under the leadership of Ohnesorge and the northern group in Bargteheide under Nagel. After the fall of Berlin on 2 May, Nagel was charged with carrying out the duties of the Reich postal minister in the Flensburg government of Grand Admiral Karl Dönitz. On 23 May 1945, Nagel was arrested by British troops along with all other members of the Dönitz administration at its headquarters in the Mürwik Naval School.

== Post-war life ==
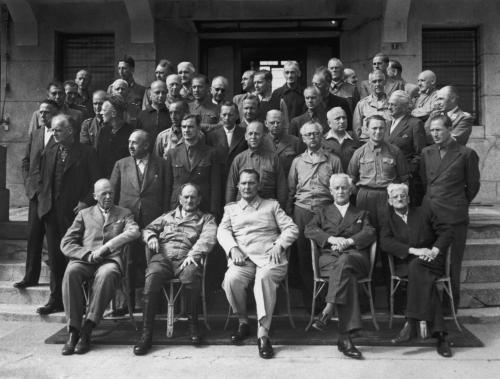
Nazi prisoners at Camp Ashcan in August 1945. Nagel is in the second row, center, directly behind Hermann Göring

Nagel was first held in Camp Ashcan at Mondorf-les-Bains in Luxembourg. He then was interned in U.S. camps in Butzbach and Darmstadt due to his membership in the higher civil service and his role as an NSKK-Gruppenführer, but he was released in August 1946. The American interrogating officer, Major Ivo Giannini, stated that he questioned Nagel about the structure and operations of the German Reichspost, but no evidence of any involvement in criminal activity had emerged.

In late 1947, Nagel underwent denazification proceedings in Detmold. However, because he emigrated to Argentina in 1948 following a job offer from the Perón government, the case was closed without a formal finding. In 1955, several members of the Detmold denazification tribunal who had been involved in the case, confirmed that a classification in Class III (lesser offenders) had been envisaged and one member anticipated a change in interpretation criteria that would have led to a classification in Class IV (fellow travelers). In 1999, Wolfgang Lotz noted in Die Deutsche Reichspost 1933–1939: "Overall, however, Nagel remained in the background; no political initiatives of his own are evident."

From April 1948, Nagel worked as a technical consultant for the Argentine government agency Dirección General de Fabricaciones Militares in Buenos Aires, assisting in the reorganization of Argentina's technical communications sector. He returned to Germany in late 1952, initially serving as technical director of ATF Allgemeine Telefon-Fabrik in Hamburg (acquired by DeTeWe in 1957). From November 1954, he worked as a telecommunications consultant for Felten & Guilleaume Fernmeldeanlagen (FGF) in Nuremberg. He rose to the position of sales director in November 1956, and remained with the company until his retirement at the end of 1965. He died in Nuremberg in 1973.

== Publications ==
Books

- Jakob Nagel and Hans Lampe: Die Personalpolitik der Deutschen Reichspost im Dritten Reich. Berlin, 1937.

Journals

- Der Fernmelde-Ingenieur (Ed.), Berlin 1941–1944.

Articles

- Die Deutsche Reichspost im nationalsozialistischen Staat. In: Deutsche Verkehrs-Zeitung (1877–1945). 1935, pp. 211–216.
- 2 Jahre Aufbauarbeit bei der Deutschen Reichspost. In: DVZ. 1935, pp. 425–434.
- Sozial- und Personalpolitik der Deutschen Reichspost. In: DVZ. pp. 826–837.
- Nationalsozialistische Grundsätze der Personalpolitik der Deutschen Reichspost. In: DVZ. 1936, pp. 317–320.
- Vortrag zur Sozial- und Personalpolitik. In: DVZ. 1936, pp. 494–497.
- Aufgaben einer nationalsozialistischen Personalpolitik. In: DVZ. 1936, pp. 833–841.
- Die Aufgaben der Deutschen Reichspost im Dritten Reich. In: DVZ. 1936, pp. 868–875.
- Die Personalpolitik der Deutschen Reichspost. In: DVZ. 1937, pp. 177–180.
- Gegenwartsfragen der Deutschen Reichspost. In: Archiv für Post und Telegraphie (APT) 65. 1937, pp. 147–153.
- Grundsätze für die Gestaltung großer Fernsprechnetze. In: Jahrbuch für Fernmeldewesen. Berlin, 1942.

== Sources ==
- Helge Dvorak: Biographisches Lexikon der Deutschen Burschenschaft. Volume I: Politiker [Politicians]. Part 4: M–Q. Winter, Heidelberg 2000, ISBN 3-8253-1118-X, pp. 179–180.
- Lotz, Wolfgang (1999). Die Deutsche Reichspost 1933-1945: Eine politische Verwaltungsgeschichte [The German Reich Postal Service 1933–1945: An Administrative History]. Berlin: Nicolai. ISBN 978-3-875-84915-8.
