= Giesberts =

Giesberts is a surname. Notable people with the surname include:

- Johannes Giesberts (1865–1938), German politician, minister
- Julia Giesberts (1893–1983), Dutch painter
