= Camp Ashcan =

WWII Allied prisoner-of-war camp in Luxembourg

Coordinates: 49.5050°N 6.2800°E

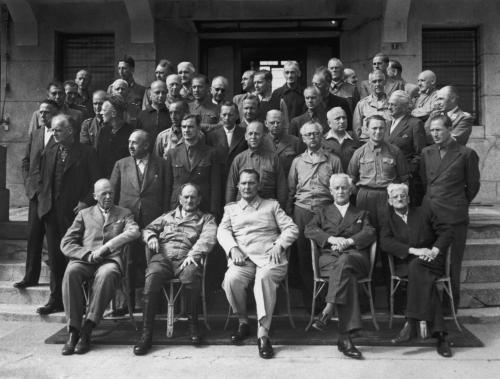
The "class of 45": Prisoners of Ashcan posing for a group photo in August 1945. In the center of the bottom row, Hermann Göring.

Central Continental Prisoner of War Enclosure No. 32, code-named Ashcan, was an Allied prisoner-of-war camp in the Palace Hotel of Mondorf-les-Bains, Luxembourg, during World War II. Operating from May to August 1945, it served as a processing station and interrogation center for the 86 most prominent surviving Nazi leaders prior to their trial in Nuremberg, including Hermann Göring and Karl Dönitz.

A British counterpart of Ashcan, Camp Dustbin in Castle Kransberg near Frankfurt am Main, housed prisoners of a more technical inclination including Albert Speer and Wernher von Braun.

== History ==
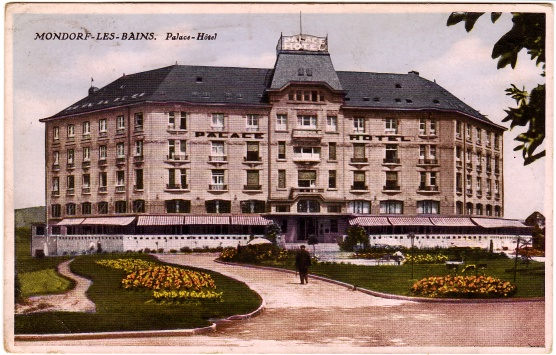
The Palace Hotel before the war.

The camp was established by order of Allied Command. It was commanded by U.S. Army Col. Burton C. Andrus, and staffed by men of the U.S. 391st Anti-Aircraft Battalion, Allied intelligence services and 42 German prisoners of war selected for their skills, including a barber, dentist, doctor and even a hotel manager.

The place selected for the camp was the Palace Hotel, a four-story luxury hotel dominating the small spa town, which had earlier in 1945 been used as a billet for U.S. troops. The hotel was transformed into a high-security area with a 15-foot (4.6 m) high electrified barbed wire fence, guard towers with machine guns and klieg lights. Conditions in the prison were spartan. The hotel furniture was replaced by Army cots and collapsible tables. To prevent suicide attempts, all inmates had their razor blades, neckties, suspenders and other personal effects confiscated.

Security was so tight that even the MPs guarding the perimeter knew not what went on inside; they quipped that getting in required "a pass signed by God, and then somebody has to verify the signature". Nonetheless, by mid-summer reports of the prisoners being kept in a "luxury hotel" began to surface. A wildly incorrect Radio Moscow broadcast told of the prisoners being served haute cuisine on silver platters, and being chauffeured around in luxury automobiles. To dispel such fabrications, Andrus declared an open house for the press on July 16 and on subsequent dates, where they could see for themselves the ordinariness of the prison conditions and that no one was being pampered.

On 10 August 1945, the prisoners were transferred to Nuremberg to stand trial, and the camp was disbanded shortly afterwards. The building continued to serve as a hotel until 1988, when it was demolished to make way for a more modern spa.

== Prisoners ==
Prisoners at Ashcan included most of the defendants in the Nuremberg Trials along with many other senior Nazi Party, government and military officials.

=== Nuremberg trials defendants ===
The following were brought to trial by the International Military Tribunal at the Nuremberg trials of November 1945 to October 1946.

- Reichsmarschall Hermann Göring, President of the Reichstag, Commander-in-Chief of the Luftwaffe and Reichsminister of Aviation
- Großadmiral Karl Dönitz, Reichspräsident, and Commander-in-Chief of the Kriegsmarine
- Generalfeldmarschall Wilhelm Keitel, Chief of Staff of the Oberkommando der Wehrmacht
- Generaloberst Alfred Jodl, Chief of Operations of the Oberkommando der Wehrmacht
- SS-Obergruppenführer Ernst Kaltenbrunner, Chief of the Reich Security Main Office
- Franz von Papen, Vice-Chancellor
- Joachim von Ribbentrop, Reichsminister of Foreign Affairs
- Wilhelm Frick, Reichsminister of the Interior, Reichsleiter and Reich Protector of Bohemia-Moravia
- Walther Funk, Reichsminister of Economics and President of the Reichsbank
- Alfred Rosenberg, Reichsminister for the Occupied Eastern Territories and Reichsleiter
- Albert Speer, Reichsminister of Armaments and War Production
- Robert Ley, Reichsorganisationsleiter, Reichsleiter and head of the German Labour Front
- Fritz Sauckel, General Plenipotentiary for Labour Deployment, Gauleiter and Reichsstatthalter of Thuringia
- Hans Frank, General Governor of Poland and Reichsleiter
- Arthur Seyß-Inquart, Reichskommissar of the Netherlands
- Julius Streicher, Gauleiter of Franconia and publisher of Der Stürmer

=== Subsequent Nuremberg trials defendants ===
The following were brought to trial in the subsequent Nuremberg trials between December 1946 and October 1948.

- Johann Ludwig Graf Schwerin von Krosigk, Reichsminister of Finance and Chief Minister of the Flensburg government
- Richard Walther Darré, Reichsminister of Food and Agriculture and Reichsleiter
- Hans Lammers, Reichsminister and Head of the Reich Chancellery
- Otto Meissner, Staatsminister and Head of the Presidential Chancellery
- Wilhelm Stuckart, Staatssekretär in the Interior Ministry and, later, Reichsminister of the Interior
- Gustav Adolf Steengracht von Moyland, Staatssekretär in the Foreign Ministry
- Ernst Wilhelm Bohle, Gauleiter for the Nazi Party/Foreign Organization
- Karl Brandt, Reichskommissar for Sanitation and Health and co-head of the Aktion T4 euthanasia program
- Generaloberst Johannes Blaskowitz, Commander-in-Chief of Army Group G and Army Group H
- General der Artillerie Walter Warlimont, Deputy Chief of Operations of the Oberkommando der Wehrmacht
- General der Infanterie Hermann Reinecke, Chief of the General Office of the Oberkommando der Wehrmacht

=== Others ===
Other prisoners included:

- Franz Seldte, Reichsminister of Labor
- Friedrich Wilhelm Kritzinger, Staatssekretär and Deputy Chief of the Reich Chancellery
- Hans-Joachim Riecke, Staatssekretär in the Ministry of Food and Agriculture
- Werner Zschintzsch, Staatssekretär in the Reich Ministry of Science, Education and Culture
- Jakob Nagel Staatssekretär in the Reich Postal Ministry
- Kurt Daluege, Chief of the Ordnungspolizei (Order Police) and Deputy Reich Protector of Bohemia-Moravia
- Walter Buch, Reichsleiter and Chief of the Supreme Party Court
- Franz Xaver Schwarz, Reichsleiter and National Treasurer of the Nazi Party
- Franz Ritter von Epp, Reichsleiter and Reichsstatthalter (Reich Governor) of Bavaria
- Paul Wegener, Gauleiter of Gau Weser-Ems and Reichsstatthalter of Bremen and Oldenburg
- Erwin Kraus, Korpsführer of the National Socialist Motor Corps
- Philipp, Landgrave of Hesse, Oberpräsident of the Province of Hesse-Nassau
- Karl Strölin, Oberbürgermeister of Stuttgart
- Generalfeldmarschall Gerd von Rundstedt, Commander-in-Chief in the West
- Generalfeldmarschall Albert Kesselring, Commander-in-Chief in the South
- Generaloberst Georg Lindemann, Commander-in-Chief in Denmark
- Vizeadmiral Leopold Bürkner, Abwehr Department Chief
- Konteradmiral Gerhard Wagner, Chief of Naval Operations and Chief of the Military Cabinet of the Flensburg government
- Admiral Miklós Horthy, Regent of the Kingdom of Hungary
- Albert Göring, brother of Hermann Göring, later released without charges
