= Georg Schätzel =

German politician (1875–1934)

Reich Postal Minister
- In office 29 January 1927 – 30 May 1932
- Chancellor: Wilhelm Marx; Hermann Müller; Heinrich Brüning
- Preceded by: Karl Stingl
- Succeeded by: Paul Freiherr von Eltz-Rübenach

Reich Minister of Transport
- Acting; 7 February 1929 – 12 April 1929
- Chancellor: Hermann Müller
- Preceded by: Theodor von Guérard
- Succeeded by: Adam Stegerwald

Personal details
- Born: 13 May 1875 Höchstadt, Kingdom of Bavaria, German Empire
- Died: 27 November 1934 (aged 59) Munich, Nazi Germany
- Party: Bavarian People's Party
- Occupation: Lawyer

Georg Schätzel (1875–1934) was a German jurist and politician. He was a member of the Bavarian People's Party and served as the minister of post between 29 January 1927 and 1 June 1932.

== Biography ==
Schätzel was born in Höchstadt, Bavaria, on 13 May 1875. He graduated from gymnasium in Bamberg and studied law in Munich completing his studies in 1895. He worked as a lawyer in Munich. Then he worked at the postal agency and the ministry for transport in Munich. In 1923 he became the state secretary and head of the Bavarian district of the Reich postal administration.

Schätzel joined the Bavarian People's Party. He served as an acting minister of transport for a brief period in 1929. He was appointed minister of post on 29 January 1927 which he held until 30 May 1932. During his term Schätzel served in the cabinets headed by Wilhelm Marx, Hermann Müller and Heinrich Brüning. From February to April 1929 Schätzel was also acting minister of transport.

Schätzel died in Munich on 27 November 1934.
