= Johannes Giesberts =

German politician (1865-1938)

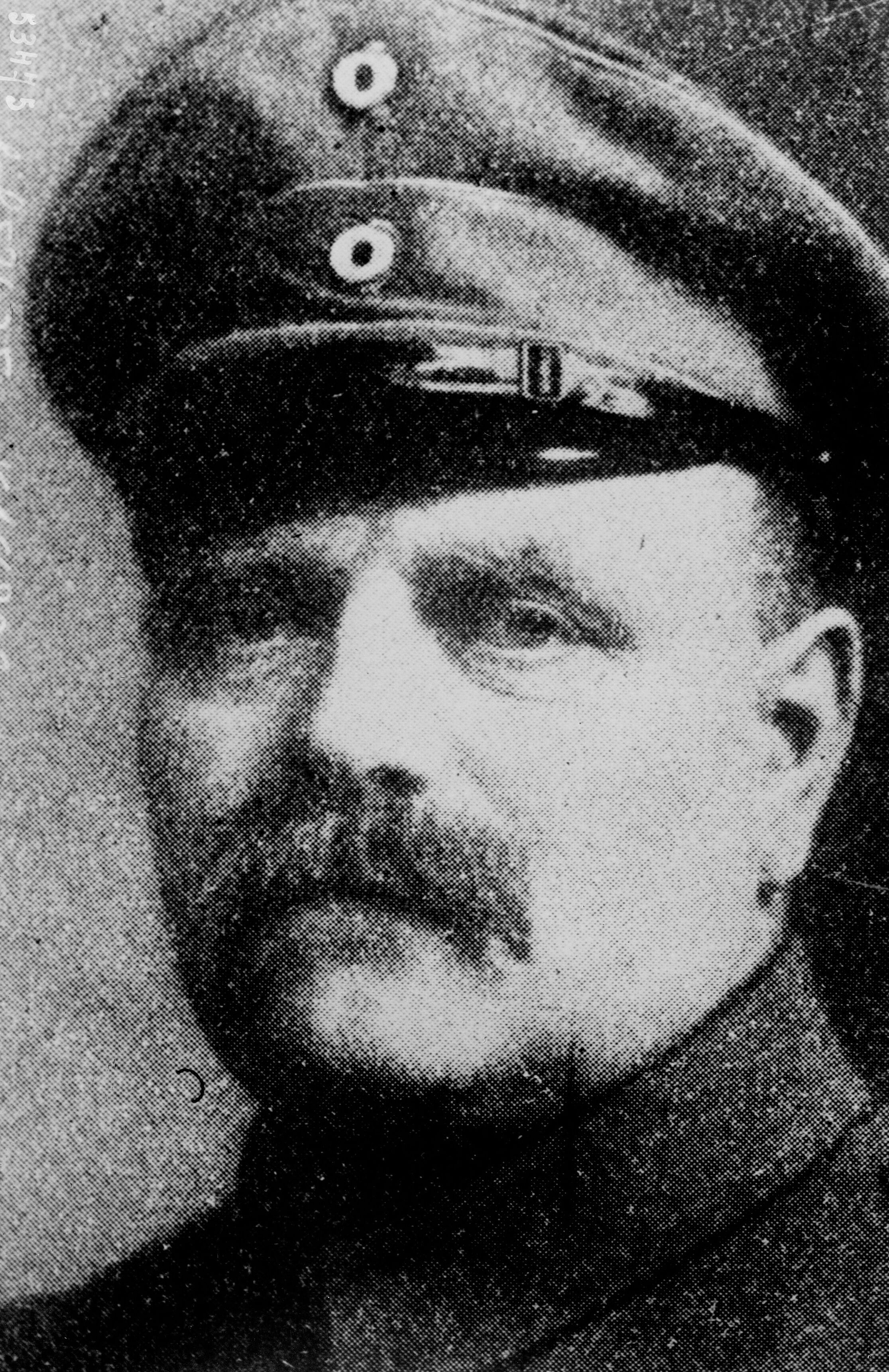
- Giesberts in 1919

Reich Postal Minister
- In office 13 February 1919 – 2 November 1922
- President: Friedrich Ebert
- Chancellor: Philipp Scheidemann; Gustav Bauer; Hermann Müller; Constantin Fehrenbach; Joseph Wirth
- Preceded by: ministry created
- Succeeded by: Karl Stingl

Member of the Reichstag
- In office 1905–1918
- Preceded by: Gerhard Stötzel
- In office June 1920 – March 1933

Member of the Weimar National Assembly
- In office 1919–1920

Member of the Prussian House of Representatives
- In office 1906–1918

Personal details
- Born: 3 February 1865 Straelen, Rhine Province, Kingdom of Prussia
- Died: 7 August 1938 (aged 73) Mönchengladbach, Gau Westphalia-North, Nazi Germany
- Party: Centre Party (1892-?)

Johannes Giesberts (3 February 1865 - 7 August 1938) was a German politician of the Centre Party in the Weimar Republic. He most notably served as the first Reich Postal Minister, which was a successor to the Reichspost, from 1919 to 1922 under Friedrich Ebert.

Giesberts was born in Straelen. Initially pursuing to become a baker like his father, he began an apprenticeship before becoming a wage laborer in many different positions. He became active in trade union politics during this time, joining the Catholic Workers' Movement in 1893 and becoming a city councillor in Mönchengladbach. Giesberts took courses from the People's Association for Catholic Germany and co-founded the Christian Metalworkers' Association. He quit working as a laborer in 1899, becoming an editor for the Westdeutsche Arbeiterzeitung, which was the organ of the Catholic workers' associations. In 1905 he was elected to the Reichstag for Essen, staying there until 1918 as a loyal member of the Centre Party. He then joined the Weimar National Assembly from 1919 to 1920.

In 1919 he was appointed Reich Postal Minister. In this position he oversaw the first commemorative, semi-postal, and airmail for the Weimar Republic and merged Bavaria and Württemberg's telegraph agencies into the Reichspost in accordance to the Weimar Constitution. He resigned in 1922, returning to working in the Reichstag full-time until 1933, when the Nazi Party took power. After they took power, he was briefly a prisoner and then became politically silent, with the Gestapo labelling him as having "no longer carried out any activity". He died in 1938 in Mönchengladbach.

== Early life ==
Giesberts was born on 3 February 1865 in Straelen, Kingdom of Prussia, as the son of a master baker, Jacob Giesberts (1837-1889), and Hubertine (1836-1874). He attended elementary school and then began an apprenticeship as a baker, like his father. After completing his apprenticeship, he worked as a wage laborer in many positions including as a farm laborer, bricksworks worker, and oil mill worker.

From 1885 to 1888 he served in the military as part of the 59th Infantry Regiment in Düsseldorf. After having worked as a laborer, he was a brewery worker. He was then a boiler stoker and a metalworker for Kölnische Volkszeitung in Cologne-Nippes from 1891 to 1899. In this position he first became active in trade union politics, joining the Catholic Workers' Movement in 1893. In 1895 he participated in the People's Association for Catholic Germany's socio-political courses. After completing the course, he first became a workers' secretary. He then became a co-founder and board member of the Christian Metalworkers' Association.

In 1899 he started working full-time in the workers' movement as an editor for the Westdeutsche Arbeiterzeitung, which was the organ of the Catholic workers' associations, which he left stopped in 1905 upon being elected. Until 1914 he was also a diocesan secretary of the Catholic workers' associations of the Archdiocese of Cologne.

== Political career ==
=== Local politics ===
Giesberts first entered local politics as a city councillor in Mönchengladbach in 1892 as part of the Centre Party, a position he would hold until 1918. He was also an election campaign speaker in 1898 within Germany for the party. In 1903 he also became a member of the committee of the Rhenish Centre Party.

=== First World War and Assemblies ===
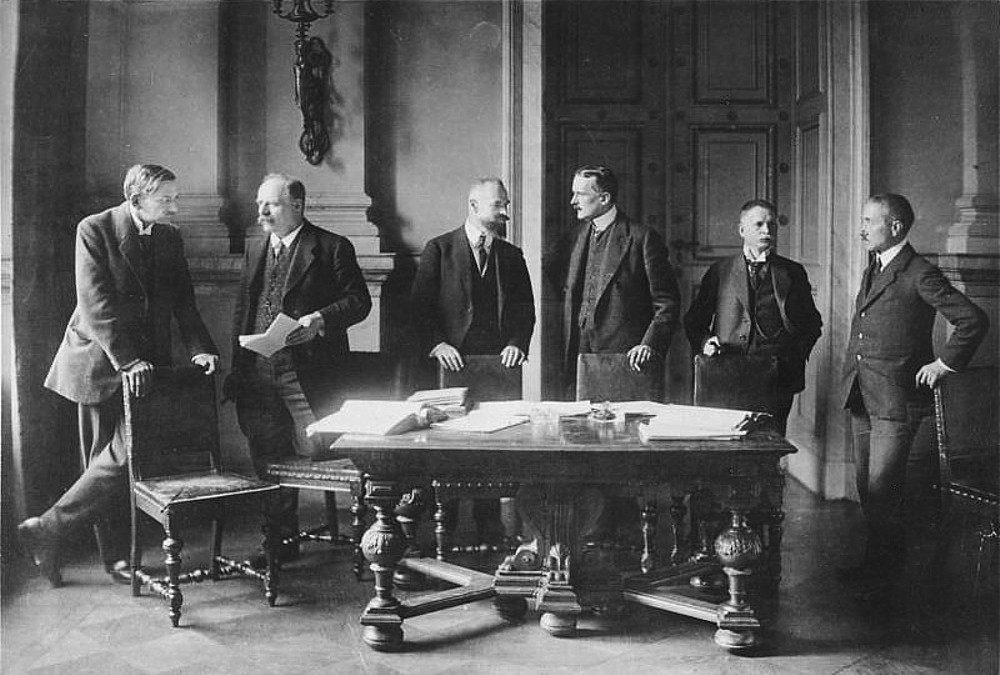
Giesberts in 1919 with the German negotiation to the Treaty of Versailles. He is second to left.

In September 1905 he was elected to the Reichstag for Essen, inheriting Gerhard Stötzel's seat. With this election, he was the first workers' representative of the Centre Party in the Reichstag. He was re-elected in 1907, and then 1912, staying in the Reichstag until 1918 as a consistent member of the petitions committee. In the Reichstag he was a loyal member of the Centre Party, refusing to join a new party that Adam Stegerwald and other leaders of the Rhenish Centre Party proposed. While also a member of the Reichstag, he joined the Prussian House of Representatives in 1906, which he would also leave in 1918.

During the First World War he was an administrative inspector at the War Press Office, War Food Office, and the Red Cross, in addition to his assembly duties. He was also a social expert to the then Belgian provincial governor, Gaston van de Werve et de Schilde and was a lecturer at the Western Front.

Giesberts was then appointed to the Reich Economic Office in 1918 as a councillor for economic and social policy matters. He was then switched to the Reich Ministry of Labour upon its formation in late 1918 as Undersecretary of State there, which he left in 1919. He became a member of the Weimar National Assembly from 1919 to 1920, the entire time that it existed.

=== Reich Postal Minister ===
On 13 February 1919 he was appointed Reich Postal Minister, the first to serve in this point after it succeeded from the Reichspost, as part of Philipp Scheidemann's cabinet. As part of the ministry, he was a part of the German negotiation to the Paris Peace Conference in the immediate aftermath of the war. When presented with the Treaty of Versailles, it was reported that he called the treaty "shameful" and criticized Woodrow Wilson as a scoundrel.

On 29 April 1920, postage exemptions for much of North Germany was repealed, which had been in place since 1869. New regulations are put in place, specifying a fee for telegrams at 20 Pfennigs for each word, and also revising the amount for telephones.

In 1919 the first commemorative, semi-postal, and airmail stamps were introduced. Upon the implementation of the Weimar Constitution, by Article 170, Bavaria and Württemberg's telegraph agencies were ordered to be taken over by the Reich by 1 April 1921, although after 1 October 1920 the Reichsgericht would decide the case. Bavaria and Württemberg's postal systems were merged into the Reichspost on 1 April 1920, in accordance with treaties signed in March.

Giesberts formally resigned on 24 November 1922.

=== Later political activities ===
After leaving as minister, he returned to the Reichstag from 1920 to 1933. During this time, he was a member of the board of the Centre faction, Chairman of the Transport Committee, and a member of the Waterways Advisory Council.

After the Nazi Party took power, he briefly had to serve a prison sentence for offences against the Cooperative Act. In September 1935 he moved from Grunewald to Mönchengladbach and in a 1937 internal letter by the Gestapo was described as having "no longer carried out any activity. He has no longer appeared politically."

=== Death ===
Giesberts died on 7 August 1938 in Mönchengladbach, then part of Nazi Germany.
