= Reich Postal Ministry =

Coordinates: 52°30′35″N 13°23′13″E

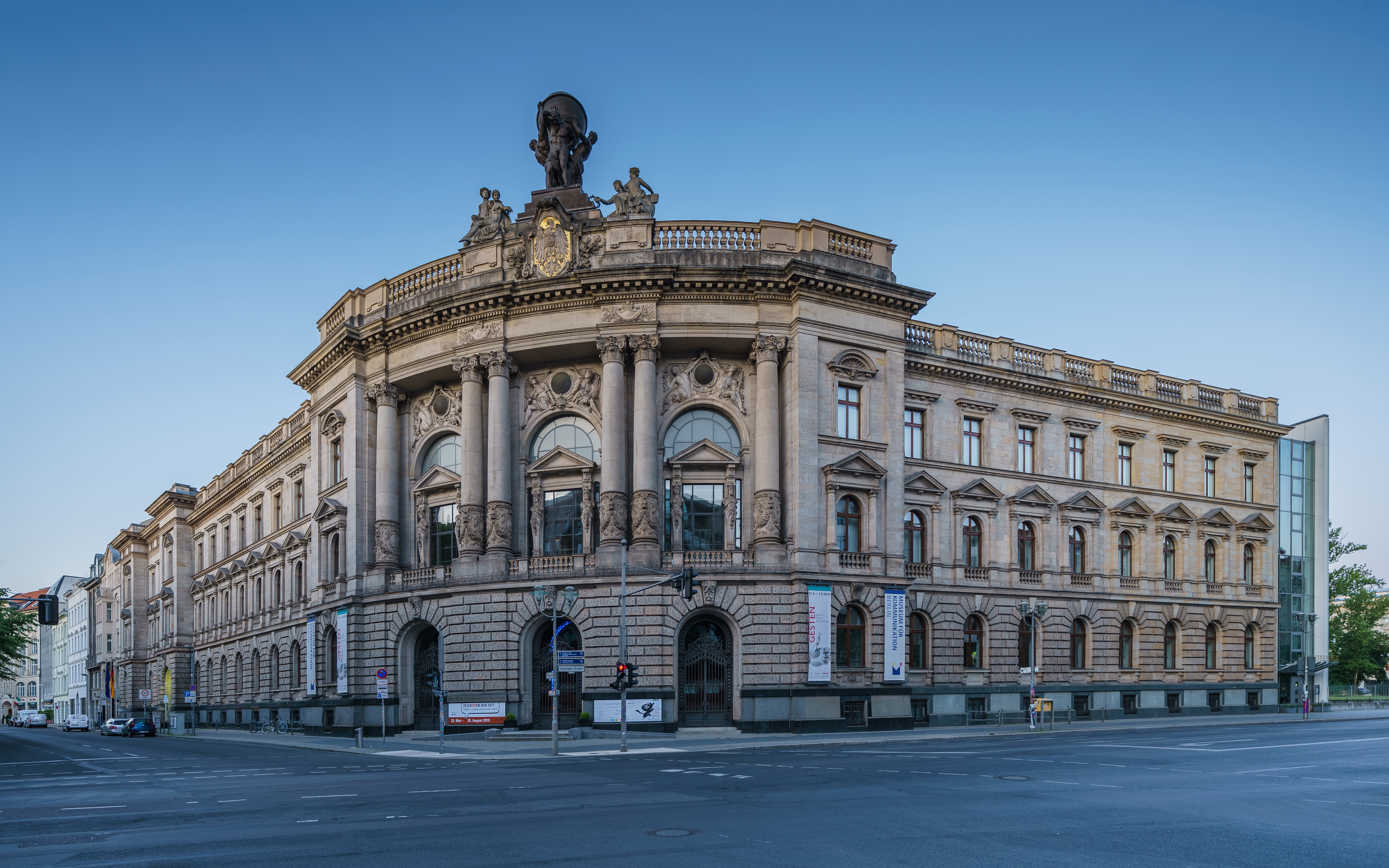
- Reich Postal Ministry Building at Leipziger Straße, Berlin

Agency overview
- Formed: 13 February 1919
- Dissolved: 23 May 1945
- Jurisdiction: Government of the Weimar Republic (until 1934); Government of Nazi Germany (from 1934)
- Minister responsible: See list

The Reich Postal Ministry (German: Reichspostministerium, RPM) in Berlin was the Ministry in charge of the Mail and the Telecommunications of the German Weimar Republic from 1919 until 1933 as well as of Nazi Germany from 1933 to 1945. After the Second World War, the Federal Ministry of Post and Telecommunications in West Germany (Federal Republic of Germany) and the Ministry of Post and Telecommunications in East Germany (German Democratic Republic) took over the postal system in their respective nations.

Especially during the Nazi era, the Ministry had authority over research and development departments in the areas of television engineering, high-frequency technology, cable (wide-band) transmission, metrology, and acoustics (microphone technology).

== Formation ==
After World War I, in February 1919, the ministry succeeded the former Reichspost agency of the German Empire that had been established in the course of the German unification in 1871. The office building of the Reich Postal Ministry was built between 1871 and 1874 in the Leipziger Straße, Berlin. Today it houses the Museum of Communications.

The hyperinflation in the Weimar Republic created a deficit in the post- and telecommunications services. The act of 1924 (Reichspostfinanzgesetz), created the Deutsche Reichspost (DRP) as a separate entity within the RPM; financially independent, covering their expenditures with user fees, yet organizationally and personnelwise part of the national government and civil service system. Its assets received the status of a special assets, separate from the general government assets.

When the Nazis seized control of the government in 1933, political prerogatives became decisive, leading to the RPM with the DRP becoming an instrument for the strategic leadership of the government and the Wehrmacht. Political and military directives determined the direction of the structural and technological development of the DRP services. The principle of the DRP as a business enterprise was replaced by the Nazi tenet that the DRP was a government agency exercising important sovereign rights of the State.

During the period 1933–1935, the DRP became politically realigned and used as an instrument for the Nazi economic policy. The period 1936–1939 saw the DRP subordinate to the policy of economic self-sufficiency and preparation for war.

In 1935, when the Territory of the Saar Basin, was incorporated into Germany, the postal and telecommunication services of the territory was integrated into the DRP. With the annexation of Austria in 1938, the Austrian postal and telegraph administration and the postal saving bureau became part of the DRP. During World War II, the DRP became an agency for warfare.

== Ministers of Post, 1918–1945 ==
No.	Portrait	Ministers of Post	Took office	Left office	Time in office	Party	Cabinet
1	Johannes Giesberts	Johannes Giesberts (1865–1938)	13 February 1919	14 November 1922	3 years, 274 days	Centre	Scheidemann cabinet Bauer cabinet First Müller cabinet Fehrenbach cabinet First Wirth cabinet Second Wirth cabinet
2	Karl Stingl	Karl Stingl (1864–1936)	22 November 1922	12 August 1923	263 days	BVP	Cuno cabinet
3	Anton Höfle	Anton Höfle (1882–1925)	13 August 1923	15 January 1925	1 year, 155 days	Centre	First Stresemann cabinet Second Stresemann cabinet First Marx cabinet Second Marx cabinet
(2)	Karl Stingl	Karl Stingl (1864–1936)	15 January 1925	17 December 1926	1 year, 336 days	BVP	First Luther cabinet Second Luther cabinet Third Marx cabinet
4	Georg Schätzel	Georg Schätzel (1875–1934)	28 January 1927	30 May 1932	5 years, 123 days	BVP	Fourth Marx cabinet Second Müller cabinet First Brüning cabinet Second Brüning cabinet
5	Paul Freiherr von Eltz-Rübenach	Paul Freiherr von Eltz-Rübenach (1875–1943)	1 June 1932	2 February 1937	4 years, 246 days	Independent	Papen cabinet Schleicher cabinet Hitler cabinet
6	Wilhelm Ohnesorge	Wilhelm Ohnesorge (1872–1962)	2 February 1937	30 April 1945	8 years, 87 days	NSDAP	Hitler cabinet
7	Julius Dorpmüller	Julius Dorpmüller (1869–1945)	5 May 1945	23 May 1945	21 days	NSDAP	Schwerin von Krosigk Cabinet

== Organization ==
During World War II, the organization of the Reich Postal Ministry was as follows:

Central organization

- Minister: Dr.-Ing. Wilhelm Ohnesorge (1937-1945)
- Under-Secretary: Jakob Nagel (1937-1945)
- Administrative Council: Six members
- Bureaus:
  - Bureau of foreign and colonial policy
  - Central Bureau: Feldpost, Postschutz, among other matters
  - Special Bureau F1: Radio engineering construction and broadcasting technology
  - Bureau I: Mail
  - Bureau II: Telephone communications
  - Bureau III: Telegraph- and radio communications
  - Bureau IV: Personnel
  - Bureau V: Budget and finances
  - Bureau VI: Administration, procurement, automotive, technical

Central agencies

- Central administration of the Reichspost (see below)
- Research establishment of the Reichspost
- Central administration of the pension institution of the Reichspost
- Construction directorate of the Reichspost

Subordinate agencies

- The pension institution of the Reichspost
- Government printing office

== Deutsche Reichspost ==
=== Organization ===
- Central administration of the Reichspost, functioning as the regional directorate for Berlin.
- 37 regional postal and telecommunications directorates. Each directorate came under a president who was in charge of all postal and telecommunication services within his region. A financial office was in charge of the accountancy and disbursement of moneys.

=== Services ===
The following services were provided by the Deutsche Reichspost:

- Postal services, including mail delivery, postal checking accounts, commercial accounts, and pneumatic tube delivery in Berlin and Munich.
- Post office saving bank system
- Motor transport service, primarily for mail delivery but also for rural passenger service. It was often the only public transportation available in rural areas not served by the railways.
- Public telegraph, telephone, cable and teletype services.
- Technical personnel and maintenance for the German Broadcasting Corporation.
- Commercial radio telegraph and telephone services with land stations, ships and aircraft.

== Research activities ==
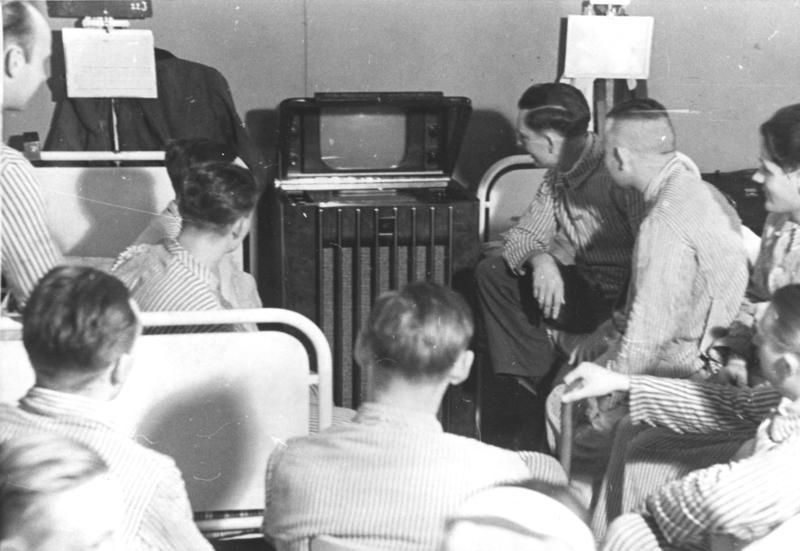
Wounded German soldiers watching television in the military hospital 1942.

In 1920 the Telegraphentechnische Reichsamt department for telegraphy was established, re-arranged as the Reichspostzentralamt research centre for telegraphy, telephony and radio electronics in 1928.

On 1 January 1937, Department VIII of the former Reichspostzentralamt formed the core of the Forschungsanstalt der Deutschen Reichspost. From that date, the RPM subsumed all research and development departments in the areas of television engineering, high-frequency technology, cable (wide-band) transmission, metrology, and acoustics (microphone technology). The engineer Wilhelm Ohnesorge became the Postal Minister from February of that year. The RPM had its own 500,000-square meter research site in Miersdorf near Zeuthen outside of Berlin. Dr. Friedrich Wilhelm Banneitz, a television authority, was head of research. Dr. Friedrich Vilbig, an authority on high-frequency engineering, was his deputy.

The RPM supported independent research, such as nuclear physics, high-frequency technology, isotope separation, electron microscopy, and communications technology at the private research laboratory Forschungslaboratoriums für Elektronenphysik of Manfred von Ardenne, in Berlin-Lichterfelde. In 1940, the RPM began construction of a cyclotron for von Ardenne; it was completed in 1945.

== Postschutz ==
Postschutz (Postal Protection) was a paramilitary unit of the DRP with a mission to protect post and telecommunication installations from armed attacks. All male postal employees could become volunteer members of the Postschutz. For all new employees from 1933, under the age of 35, it was mandatory. In 1942, the postal protection was subsumed into the Allgemeine SS; this was just one more step in the national socialization of the Deutsche Reichspost.

== Air Raid Precautions ==
The object of the Postluftschutz (air raid precautions) was to protect the customers, personnel and installations of the DRP from the danger of air raids. The implementation of the air raid precautions rested with the Postal Protection until 1944, when the war made it mandatory for the Postal Protection to focus on its military mission.

== Literature ==
- Klaus Hentschel, editor and Ann M. Hentschel, editorial assistant and Translator Physics and National Socialism: An Anthology of Primary Sources (Birkhäuser, 1996)
- Oleynikov, Pavel V. German Scientists in the Soviet Atomic Project, The Nonproliferation Review Volume 7, Number 2, 1 – 30 (2000). The author has been a group leader at the Institute of Technical Physics of the Russian Federal Nuclear Center in Snezhinsk (Chelyabinsk-70).
