= Manfred von Ardenne =

German researcher and applied physicist (1907–1997)

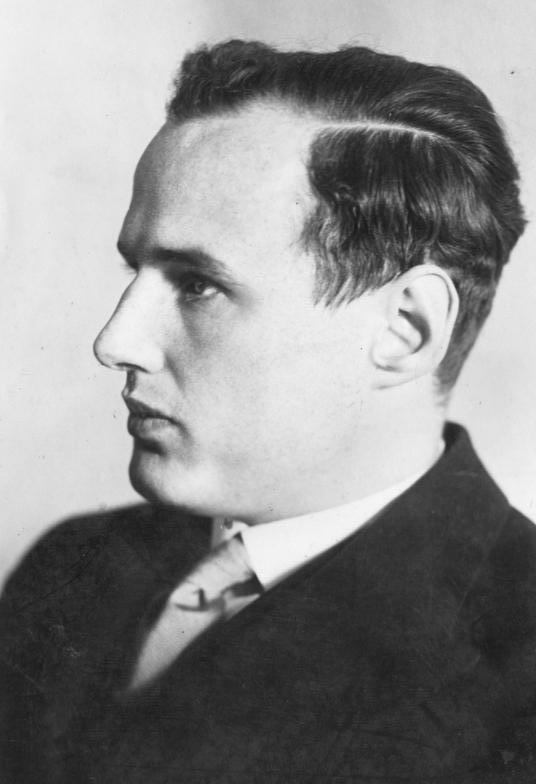
- Ardenne c. 1930
- Born: 20 January 1907; Hamburg, Germany
- Died: 26 May 1997 (aged 90); Dresden, Saxony, Germany
- Known for: Soviet program of nuclear weapons Scanning electron microscope Scanning transmission electron microscopy Isotope separation Cathode-ray tube Duoplasmatron
- Awards: Lenin Medal (1970); National Prize (1965, 1958); Stalin Prize (1953, 1947)
- Scientific career
- Fields: Applied Physics
- Institutions: Technical University Dresden

Manfred Baron von Ardenne (German pronunciation: [ˈmanfʁeːt fɔn aʁˈdɛn]; 20 January 1907 – 26 May 1997) was a German researcher, autodidact in applied physics, and an inventor. He took out approximately 600 patents in fields including electron microscopy, medical technology, nuclear technology, plasma physics, and radio and television technology. From 1928 to 1945, he directed his self-funded and private research laboratory Forschungslaboratorium für Elektronenphysik, where he developed and invented many techniques used in modern physics.

After World War II, von Ardenne was held in Soviet custody and was one of many of the German nuclear physicists in the Soviet program of nuclear weapons, and later honored with the Stalin Prize.

Upon his return to the then East Germany, he started another private engineering firm, Forschungsinstitut Manfred von Ardenne. Ardenne is seen as one of the main inventors of the television.

== Career ==
=== Early years ===
The stormy life of von Ardenne's grandmother, Elisabeth von Ardenne (1853–1952), is said to have been the inspiration for Effi Briest by Theodor Fontane, one of the most famous German realist novels.

Born in 1907 in Hamburg to a wealthy aristocratic family, Ardenne was the oldest of five children. In 1913, Ardenne's father, assigned to the Kriegsministerium, moved to Berlin. From Ardenne's earliest youth, he was intrigued by any form of technology, and this was fostered by his parents. Ardenne's early education was at home through private teachers. In Berlin, from 1919, Ardenne attended the Realgymnasium, where he pursued his interests in physics and technology. In a school competition, he submitted models of a camera and an alarm system, for which he was awarded first place.

In 1923, at the age of 15, he received his first patent for an electronic tube with multiple (three) systems in a single tube for applications in wireless telegraphy. At this time, Ardenne prematurely left the Gymnasium to pursue the development of radio engineering with the entrepreneur Siegmund Loewe, who became his mentor. Loewe built the inexpensive Loewe-Ortsempfänger OE333 with Ardenne's multiple system electronic tube. In 1925, from patent sales and publication income, Ardenne substantially improved the broadband amplifier (resistance-coupled amplifier), which was fundamental to the development of television and radar.

Without an Abitur, because he did not graduate from the Gymnasium, Ardenne entered university-level study of physics, chemistry, and mathematics. After four semesters, he left his formal studies, due to the inflexibility of the university system, and educated himself; he became an autodidact and devoted himself to applied physics research.

In 1928, he came into his inheritance with full control as to how it could be spent, and he established his private research laboratory Forschungslaboratorium für Elektronenphysik, in Berlin-Lichterfelde, to conduct his own research on radio and television technology and electron microscopy. He invented the scanning electron microscope. He financed the laboratory with income he received from his inventions and from contracts with other concerns. For example, his research on nuclear physics and high-frequency technology was financed by the Reichspostministerium (RPM, Reich Postal Ministry), headed by Wilhelm Ohnesorge. M von Ardenne attracted top-notch personnel to work in his facility, such as the nuclear physicist Fritz Houtermans, in 1940. Ardenne also conducted research on isotope separation. The small list of equipment Ardenne had in the laboratory is impressive for a private laboratory. For example, when on 10 May 1945 he was visited by NKVD Colonel General V. A. Makhnjov, accompanied by Soviet physicists Isaak Kikoin, Lev Artsimovich, Georgy Flyorov, and V. V. Migulin (of the Russian Alsos operation), they praised the research being conducted and the equipment, including an electron microscope, a 60-ton cyclotron, and plasma-ionic isotope separation installation.

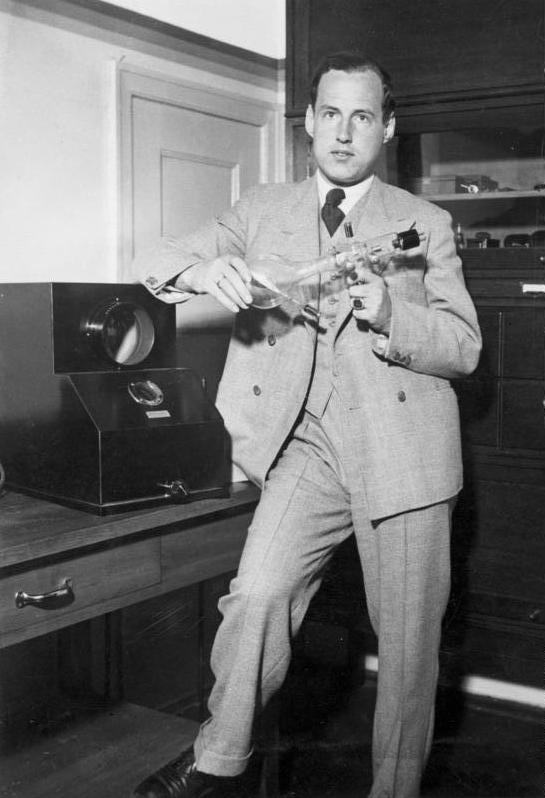
Ardenne in 1933

At the Berlin Radio Show in August 1931, Ardenne gave the world's first public demonstration of a television system using a cathode-ray tube for both transmission and reception. (Ardenne never developed a camera tube, using the CRT instead as a flying-spot scanner to scan slides and film.) Ardenne achieved his first transmission of television pictures on 24 December 1933, followed by test runs for a public television service in 1934. The world's first electronically scanned television service then started in Berlin in 1935, the Fernsehsender Paul Nipkow, culminating in the live broadcast of the 1936 Summer Olympic Games from Berlin to public places all over Germany.

In 1937, Ardenne developed the scanning transmission electron microscope. During World War II, he took part in the study and application of radar.

In 1941 the "Leibniz-Medaille" of the "Preußische Akademie der Wissenschaften" was awarded to Ardenne, and in January 1945, he received the title of "Reichsforschungsrat" (Empire Research Advisor).

=== In the Soviet Union ===
Von Ardenne, Gustav Hertz, Nobel laureate and director of Research Laboratory II at Siemens, Peter Adolf Thiessen, ordinarius professor at the Humboldt University of Berlin and director of the Kaiser-Wilhelm Institut für physikalische Chemie und Elektrochemie (KWIPC) in Berlin-Dahlem, and Max Volmer, ordinarius professor and director of the Physical Chemistry Institute at the Berlin Technische Hochschule, had made a pact. The pact was a pledge that whoever first made contact with the Soviets would speak for the rest. The objectives of their pact were threefold: (1) Prevent plunder of their institutes, (2) Continue their work with minimal interruption, and (3) Protect themselves from prosecution for any political acts of the past. Before the end of World War II, Thiessen, a member of the NSDAP, had Communist contacts. On 27 April 1945, Thiessen arrived at von Ardenne's institute in an armored vehicle with a major of the Soviet Army, who was also a leading Soviet chemist, and they issued Ardenne a protective letter (Schutzbrief).

All four of the pact members were taken to the Soviet Union. Von Ardenne was made head of Institute A, in Sinop, a suburb of Sukhumi. In his first meeting with Lavrentiy Beria, von Ardenne was asked to participate in the Soviet atomic bomb project, but von Ardenne quickly realized that participation would prohibit his repatriation to Germany, so he suggested isotope enrichment as an objective, which was agreed to.

Goals of Ardenne's Institute A included: (1) Electromagnetic separation of isotopes, for which von Ardenne was the leader, (2) Techniques for manufacturing porous barriers for isotope separation, for which Peter Adolf Thiessen was the leader, and (3) Molecular techniques for separation of uranium isotopes, for which Max Steenbeck was the leader; Steenbeck was a colleague of Hertz at Siemens.

Others at Institute A included Ingrid Schilling, Alfred Schimohr, Gerhard Siewert, and Ludwig Ziehl. By the end of the 1940s, nearly 300 Germans were working at the institute, and they were not the total work force.

Hertz was made head of Institute G, in Agudseri (Agudzery), about 10 km southeast of Sukhumi and a suburb of Gul’rips (Gulrip'shi); after 1950, Hertz moved to Moscow. Volmer went to the Nauchno-Issledovatel'skiy Institut-9 (NII-9, Scientific Research Institute No. 9), in Moscow; he was given a design bureau to work on the production of heavy water. In Institute A, Thiessen became leader for developing techniques for manufacturing porous barriers for isotope separation.

At the suggestion of authorities, Ardenne eventually shifted his research from isotope separation to plasma research directed towards controlled nuclear fusion.

In 1947, Ardenne was awarded a Stalin Prize for his development of a table-top electron microscope. In 1953, before his return to Germany, he was awarded a Stalin Prize, first class, for contributions to the atomic bomb project; the money from this prize, 100,000 Rubles, was used to buy the land for his private institute in East Germany. According to an agreement that Ardenne made with authorities in the Soviet Union soon after his arrival, the equipment which he brought to the Soviet Union from his laboratory in Berlin-Lichterfelde was not to be considered as "reparations" to the Soviet Union. Ardenne took the equipment with him in December 1954 when he returned to the then East Germany.

=== Return to (East) Germany ===
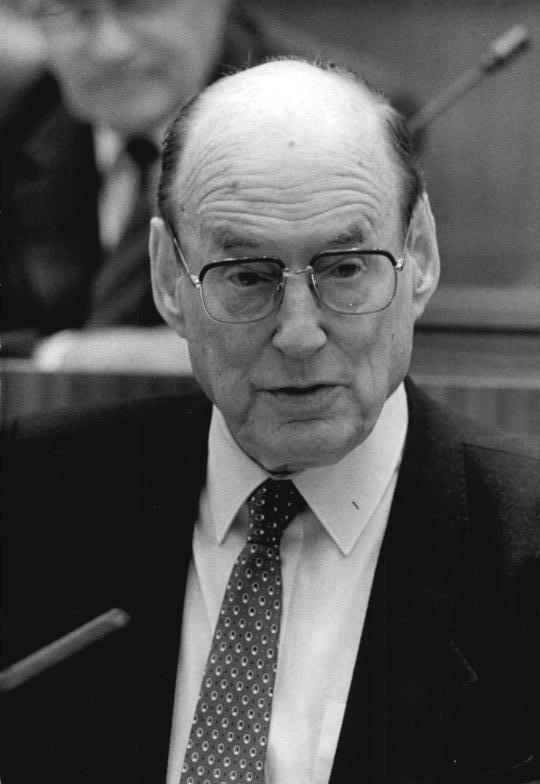
Ardenne speaks to the Volkskammer (1986).

After Ardenne's arrival in the Deutsche Demokratische Republik (DDR), he became "Professor für elektrotechnische Sonderprobleme der Kerntechnik" (Professor of electrotechnical special problems of Nuclear Technology) at the Technische Hochschule Dresden. He also founded his research institute, "Forschungsinstitut Manfred von Ardenne", in Dresden, which with over 500 employees became a unique institution in East Germany as a leading research institute that was privately run. However it collapsed with substantial debts after German reunification in 1991 and re-emerged as Von Ardenne Anlagentechnik GmbH. Ardenne twice won the GDR's National Prize.

In 1957, Ardenne became a member of the "Forschungsrat" of the DDR. In that year, he developed an endoradiosonde for medical diagnostics. In 1958, he was awarded the "Nationalpreis" of the DDR; the same year he became a member of the "Friedensrat". In 1959, he received a patent for the electron-beam furnace he developed. In 1961, he was selected a chairman of the "Internationale Gesellschaft für medizinische Elektronik und biomedizinische Technik". From the 1960s, he expanded his medical research and became well known for his oxygen multi-step therapy and cancer multi-step therapy.

In 1963, Ardenne became president of the "Kulturbund" of the DDR. During the period 1963 to 1989, he was a delegate to the "Volkskammer" of the DDR, as well as a member of the "Kulturbund-Fraktion".

After the creation of the Dresden-Hamburg city partnership (1987), Ardenne became an honorary citizen of Dresden in September 1989.

At the time of his death on 26 May 1997, Ardenne held around 600 patents.

In 2002 the German "Europäische Forschungsgesellschaft Dünne Schichten" ("European Thin-Film Research Society") named an annual prize in von Ardenne's honor.

== Personal life ==
In 1937, Ardenne married Bettina Bergengruen; they had four children.

== Honors ==
Von Ardenne received many honors:

- 3 July 1941 – Silver Leibniz Medal of the Prussian Academy of Sciences
- 2 January 1945 – Appointed to the Reichsforschungsrat
- 8 December 1947 – Stalin Prize of the USSR
- 31 December 1953 – Stalin Prize of the USSR
- 26 July 1955 – Member of the Physics Section of the German Academy of Sciences
- 10 November 1955 – Member of the Wissenschaftlichen Rates für friedliche Anwendung der Atomenergie (Scientific Council for Peaceful Applications of Atomic Energy) of the Council of Ministers of the GDR
- 1 June 1956 – Honorary Professor at the Technische Hochschule Dresden
- 15 July 1957 – Member of the Forschungsrates (Research Council) of the GDR
- 7 December 1957 – Ernst Moritz Arndt Medal
- 18 April 1958 – Peace Medal of the GDR
- 25 September 1958 – Honorary Doctorate of Natural Sciences from the Ernst Moritz Arndt University of Greifswald
- 7 October 1958 – National Prize, First Class
- 4 January 1959 – Grand Cross of Service Medal of the United Arab Republic
- 27 May 1961 – President of the Gesellschaft für biomedizinische Technik (Society for Biomedical Technology)
- 2 November 1962 – member of the Wissenschaftlichen Rates des Ministerium für Gesundheitswesen (Scientific Council of the Ministry for Health Service) of the GDR
- 7 October 1965 – National Prize, Second Class
- 15 December 1965 – Member of the International Astronautical Academy of Paris
- 12 May 1970 – Lenin Medal
- 29 October 1973 – Hans Bredow Medal
- 12 December 1978 – Honorary Doctor of Medicine of the Akademie Dresden
- 20 June 1979 – Honorary Member of the Forschungsrates of the GDR
- 1 December 1981 – Barkhausen Medal of the Technische Universität Dresden
- 20 January 1982 – Gold Patriotic Service Medal
- 22 September 1982 – Honorary Doctor of Education of the Pädagogische Hochschule Dresden*25 October 1983 – Honorary Member of the Gesellschaft für Ultraschalltechnik (Society for Ultrasonics)
- 19 February 1984 – Honorary Member of the Ärztegesellschaft für Sauerstoff-Mehrschritt-Therapie (Physicians Society for Oxygen Multi-step Therapy)
- 11 April 1986 – Wilhelm Ostwald Medal of the Saxony Academy of Sciences
- 2 June 1986 – Richard Theile Medal of the German Television Technology Society
- 9 July 1986 – Ernst Abbe Medal of the Chamber of Technology of the GDR
- 24 April 1987 – Medal of the Art and Science Senate of Hamburg
- 15 May 1987 – Ernst Krokowski Prize of the Society for Biological Cancer Prevention
- 3 March 1988 – Ernst Haeckel Medal of Urania
- 21 October 1988 – Gold Diesel Medal of Munich
- 25 November 1988 – Friedrich von Schiller Prize of Hamburg
- 26 September 1989 – Honorary Citizen of Dresden
- 15 July 1993 – Colani Design France Prize

== Books ==
- Manfred von Ardenne Tabellen der Elektronenphysik, Ionenphysik und Übermikroskopie. Bd. 1. Hauptgebiete (VEB Dt. Verl. d. Wissenschaften, 1956)
- Manfred von Ardenne Tabellen zur angewandten Kernphysik (Dt. Verl. d. Wissensch., 1956)
- Manfred von Ardenne Eine glückliche Jugend im Zeichen der Technik (Kinderbuchverl., 1962)
- Manfred von Ardenne Eine glückliche Jugend im Zeichen der Technik (Urania-Verl., 1965)
- Manfred von Ardenne Ein glückliches Leben für Technik und Forschung (Suhrkamp Verlag KG, 1982)
- Manfred von Ardenne Sauerstoff- Mehrschritt- Therapie. Physiologische und technische Grundlagen (Thieme, 1987)
- Manfred von Ardenne Sechzig Jahre für Forschung und Fortschritt. Autobiographie (Verlag der Nation, 1987)
- Manfred von Ardenne Mein Leben für Forschung und Fortschritt (Ullstein, 1987)
- Siegfried Reball, Manfred von Ardenne, and Gerhard Musiol Effekte der Physik und ihre Anwendungen (Deutscher Verlag, 1989)
- Manfred von Ardenne, Gerhard Musiol, and Siegfried Reball Effekte der Physik und ihre Anwendungen (Deutsch, 1990)
- Manfred von Ardenne Die Erinnerungen (Herbig Verlag, 1990)
- Manfred von Ardenne Fernsehempfang: Bau und Betrieb einer Anlage zur Aufnahme des Ultrakurzwellen-Fernsehrundfunks mit Braunscher Röhre (Weidmannsche, 1992)
- Manfred von Ardenne Wegweisungen eines vom Optimismus geleiteten Lebens: Sammlung von Hinweisen, Lebenserfahrungen, Erkenntnissen, Aussprüchen und Aphorismen über sieben der Forschung gewidmeten Jahrzehnte (Verlag Kritische Wissensch., 1996)
- Manfred von Ardenne Erinnerungen, fortgeschrieben (Droste, 1997)
- Manfred von Ardenne, Alexander von Ardenne, and Christian Hecht Systemische Krebs-Mehrschritt-Therapie (Hippokrates, 1997)
- Manfred von Ardenne Gesundheit durch Sauerstoff- Mehrschritt- Therapie (Nymphenburger, 1998)
- Manfred von Ardenne Wo hilft Sauerstoff-Mehrschritt-Therapie? (Urban & Fischer Verlag, 1999)
- Manfred von Ardenne Arbeiten zur Elektronik. 1930, 1931, 1937, 1961, 1968 (Deutsch, 2001)
- Manfred von Ardenne Die physikalischen Grundlagen der Rundfunkanlagen (Funk Verlag, 2002)
- Manfred von Ardenne and Manfred Lotsch Ich bin ihnen begegnet (Droste, 2002)
- Manfred von Ardenne Des Funkbastlers erprobte Schaltungen: Reprint der Originalausgabe von 1926 (Funk Verlag, 2003)
- Manfred von Ardenne, Gerhard Musiol, and Siegfried Reball Effekte der Physik und ihre Anwendungen (Deutsch, 2003)
- Manfred von Ardenne Empfang auf kurzen Wellen - Möglichkeiten, Schaltungen und praktische Winke: Reprint der Originalausgabe von 1928 (Funk Verlag, 2005)
- Manfred von Ardenne, Gerhard Musiol, and Siegfried Reball Effekte der Physik und ihre Anwendungen (Deutsch, 2005)
- Manfred von Ardenne and Kurt Borchardt (editors) Handbuch der Funktechnik und ihrer Grenzgebiete (Franckh)

== See also ==
- Technische Hochschule Dresden
- Environmental scanning electron microscope
- Raster scan
- Russian Alsos
- German inventors and discoverers

== Bibliography ==
- Albrecht, Ulrich, Andreas Heinemann-Grüder, and Arend Wellmann Die Spezialisten: Deutsche Naturwissenschaftler und Techniker in der Sowjetunion nach 1945 (Dietz, 1992, 2001) ISBN 3-320-01788-8
- Barkleit, Gerhard Manfred von Ardenne. Selbstverwirklichung im Jahrhundert der Diktaturen (Duncker & Humblot, 2006)
- Barwich, Heinz and Elfi Barwich Das rote Atom (Fischer-TB.-Vlg., 1984)
- Beneke, Klaus Die Kolloidwissenschaftler Peter Adolf Thiessen, Gerhart Jander, Robert Havemann, Hans Witzmann und ihre Zeit (Knof, 2000)
- Heinemann-Grüder, Andreas Die sowjetische Atombombe (Westfaelisches Dampfboot, 1992)
- Heinemann-Grüder, Andreas Keinerlei Untergang: German Armaments Engineers during the Second World War and in the Service of the Victorious Powers in Monika Renneberg and Mark Walker (editors) Science, Technology and National Socialism 30-50 (Cambridge, 2002 paperback edition) ISBN 0-521-52860-7
- Hentschel, Klaus (editor) and Ann M. Hentschel (editorial assistant and translator) Physics and National Socialism: An Anthology of Primary Sources (Birkhäuser, 1996) ISBN 0-8176-5312-0
- Herbst, Wilhelm Manfred von Ardenne - Eine Anthologie -: Auswahl-Dokumentation historischer Fachartikel 1925-1938 (Funk Verlag, 2007)
- Holloway, David Stalin and the Bomb: The Soviet Union and Atomic Energy 1939–1956 (Yale, 1994) ISBN 0-300-06056-4
- Kruglov, Arkadii The History of the Soviet Atomic Industry (Taylor and Francis, 2002)
- Maddrell, Paul "Spying on Science: Western Intelligence in Divided Germany 1945–1961" (Oxford, 2006) ISBN 0-19-926750-2
- Naimark, Norman M. The Russians in Germany: A History of the Soviet Zone of Occupation, 1945-1949 (Hardcover — Aug 11, 1995) Belknap
- Oleynikov, Pavel V. German Scientists in the Soviet Atomic Project, The Nonproliferation Review Volume 7, Number 2, 1 – 30 (2000). The author has been a group leader at the Institute of Technical Physics of the Russian Federal Nuclear Center in Snezhinsk (Chelyabinsk-70).
- Riehl, Nikolaus and Frederick Seitz Stalin's Captive: Nikolaus Riehl and the Soviet Race for the Bomb (American Chemical Society and the Chemical Heritage Foundations, 1996) ISBN 0-8412-3310-1. This book is a translation of Nikolaus Riehl's book Zehn Jahre im goldenen Käfig (Ten Years in a Golden Cage) (Riederer-Verlag, 1988); Seitz has written a lengthy introduction to the book. This book is a treasure trove with its 58 photographs.
- Schaaf, Michael Wir haben die russische Atombombe beschleunigt (We accelerated the building of the Russian atomic bomb) Interview with Manfred von Ardenne, in: Heisenberg, Hitler und die Bombe - Gespräche mit Zeitzeugen (GNT Verlag, Berlin 2001)
