= Hitler cabinet =

Government of Nazi Germany, 1933 to 1945

- 1st Cabinet of Nazi Germany
- 1933–1945
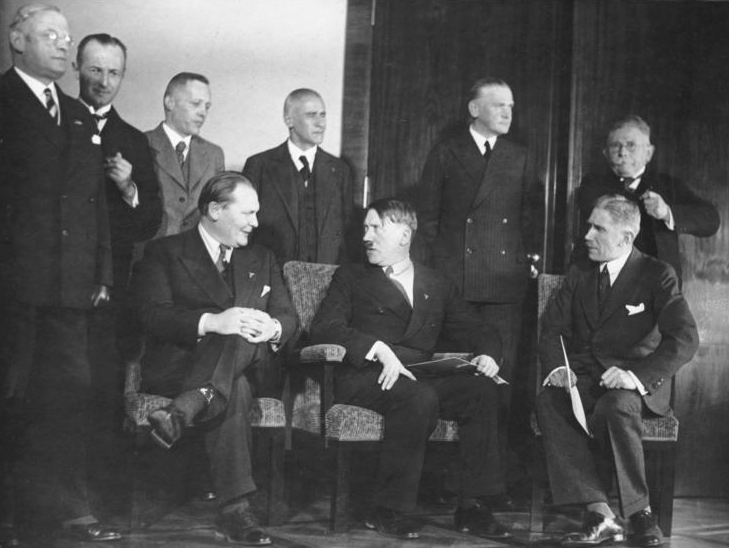
- First session of the cabinet, 30 January 1933
- Date formed: 30 January 1933; 93 years ago
- Date dissolved: 30 April 1945; 81 years ago (12 years and 3 months)

People and organisations
- President: Paul von Hindenburg (1933–1934); Adolf Hitler (as Führer, 1934–1945)
- Chancellor: Adolf Hitler
- Vice-Chancellor: Franz von Papen (1933–1934)
- Member parties: Nazi Party; German National People's Party (January–June 1933)
- Status in legislature: Minority (coalition) (January–March 1933); Majority (coalition) (March–July 1933); One-party state (from July 1933)

History
- Elections: November 1932; March 1933; November 1933; 1936; 1938
- Predecessor: Schleicher cabinet
- Successor: Goebbels cabinet

The Hitler cabinet was the government of Nazi Germany between 30 January 1933 and 30 April 1945 upon the appointment of Adolf Hitler as chancellor of Germany by President Paul von Hindenburg. It was contrived by the national conservative politician Franz von Papen, who reserved the office of the vice-chancellor for himself. Originally, Hitler's first cabinet was called the Reich Cabinet of National Salvation (German: Reichskabinett der nationalen Rettung), which was a coalition of the Nazi Party (NSDAP) and the national conservative German National People's Party (DNVP). The Hitler cabinet lasted until his suicide during the defeat of Nazi Germany. Hitler's cabinet was succeeded by the short-lived Goebbels cabinet, with Karl Dönitz appointed by Hitler as the new Reichspräsident.

== History ==
In brokering the appointment of Hitler as Reich chancellor, Papen had sought to control Hitler by limiting the number of Nazi ministers in the cabinet; initially Hermann Göring (without portfolio) and Wilhelm Frick (interior) were the only Nazi ministers. Further, Alfred Hugenberg, the head of the DNVP, was enticed into joining the cabinet by being given the economic and agricultural portfolios for both the Reich and Prussia, with the expectation that Hugenberg would be a counterweight to Hitler and would be useful in controlling him. Of the other significant ministers in the initial cabinet, Foreign Minister Konstantin von Neurath was a holdover from the previous administration, as were Finance Minister Lutz Graf Schwerin von Krosigk, Post and Transport Minister Paul Freiherr von Eltz-Rübenach, and Justice Minister Franz Gürtner.

The cabinet was "presidential" and not "parliamentary", in that it governed on the basis of emergency powers granted to the president in Article 48 of the Weimar Constitution rather than through a majority vote in the Reichstag. This had been the basis for Weimar cabinets since Hindenburg's appointment of Heinrich Brüning as chancellor in March 1930. Hindenburg specifically wanted a cabinet of the nationalist right, without participation by the Catholic Centre Party or the Social Democratic Party, which had been the mainstays of earlier parliamentary cabinets. Hindenburg turned to Papen, a former chancellor himself, to bring such a body together, but blanched at appointing Hitler as chancellor. Papen was certain that Hitler and the Nazi Party had to be included, but Hitler had previously turned down the position of vice-chancellor. So Papen, with the help of Hindenburg's son Oskar, persuaded Hindenburg to appoint Hitler as chancellor.

Initially, the Hitler cabinet, like its immediate predecessors, ruled through presidential decrees written by the cabinet and signed by Hindenburg. However, the Enabling Act of 1933, passed two months after Hitler took office, gave the cabinet the power to make laws without legislative consent or Hindenburg's signature. (Note: The Enabling Act was supposed to be effective for four years, but each time it expired, it was simply renewed.) In effect, the power to rule by decree was vested in Hitler, and for all intents and purposes, it made him a dictator. After the Enabling Act's passage, serious deliberations more or less ended at cabinet meetings. It met only sporadically after 1934, and last met in full on 5 February 1938.

When Hitler came to power, the cabinet consisted of the chancellor, the vice-chancellor and the heads of 10 Reich ministries. Between 1933 and 1941, six new Reichsministries were established, but the war ministry was abolished and replaced by the Oberkommando der Wehrmacht (OKW). The cabinet was further enlarged by the addition of several Reichsministers without portfolio and by other officials, such as the commanders-in-chief of the armed services, who were granted the rank and authority of Reichsministers but without the title. In addition, various officials – though not formally Reichsministers – such as Reich Youth Leader Baldur von Schirach, Prussian Finance Minister Johannes Popitz, and Chief of the Organisation for Germans Abroad, Ernst Wilhelm Bohle, were authorised to participate in Reich cabinet meetings when issues within their area of jurisdiction were under discussion.

As the Nazis consolidated political power, other parties were outlawed or dissolved themselves. Of the three original DNVP ministers, Franz Seldte joined the Nazi Party in April 1933, Hugenberg departed the cabinet in June when the DNVP was dissolved and Gürtner stayed on without a party designation. There were originally several other independent politicians in the cabinet, mainly holdovers from previous governments. Gereke was the first of these to be dismissed when he was arrested for embezzlement on 23 March 1933. Papen was then dismissed in early August 1934. Then, on 30 January 1937, Hitler presented the Golden Party Badge to all remaining non-Nazi members of the cabinet (Blomberg, Eltz-Rübenach, Fritsch, Gürtner, Neurath, Raeder and Schacht) and enrolled them in the Party. Only Eltz-Rübenach, a devout Roman Catholic, refused and resigned. Similarly, on 20 April 1939, Brauchitsh and Keitel were presented with the Golden Party Badge. Dorpmüller received it in December 1940 and formally joined the Party on 1 February 1941. Dönitz followed on 30 January 1944. Thus, no independent politicians or military leaders were left in the cabinet.

The actual power of the cabinet as a body was minimised when it stopped meeting in person and decrees were worked out between the ministries by sharing and marking-up draft proposals, which only went to Hitler for rejection, revision, or signing when that process was completed. The cabinet was also overshadowed by the numerous ad hoc agencies, both of the state and of the Nazi Party – such as supreme Reich authorities and plenipotentiaries – that Hitler caused to be created to deal with specific problems and situations. Individual ministers, however, especially Göring, Goebbels, Himmler, Speer, and Bormann, held extensive power, at least until, in the case of Göring and Speer, Hitler came to distrust them.

By the final years of World War II, Bormann had emerged as the most powerful minister, not because he was head of the Party Chancellery, which was the basis of his position in the cabinet, but because of his control of access to Hitler in his role as Secretary to the Führer.

== Composition ==
The Reich cabinet consisted of the following ministers:

Portfolio	Minister	Took office	Left office	Party	Ref
Chancellor of the German Reich	Adolf Hitler	30 January 1933	30 April 1945 ‡‡	NSDAP	
Vice-Chancellor of the German Reich	Franz von Papen	30 January 1933	7 August 1934	Independent	
Reich Minister of Foreign Affairs	Konstantin von Neurath	30 January 1933	4 February 1938	Independent	
Reich Minister of Foreign Affairs	Joachim von Ribbentrop	4 February 1938	30 April 1945	NSDAP	
Reich Minister of the Interior	Wilhelm Frick	30 January 1933	20 August 1943	NSDAP	
Reich Minister of the Interior	Heinrich Himmler	24 August 1943	29 April 1945	NSDAP	
Reich Minister of Finance	Lutz Graf Schwerin von Krosigk	30 January 1933	30 April 1945	Independent	
Reich Minister of Justice	Franz Gürtner	30 January 1933	29 January 1941 #	DNVP	
Reich Minister of Justice	Franz Schlegelberger (Acting)	30 January 1941	20 August 1942	NSDAP	
Reich Minister of Justice	Otto Georg Thierack	20 August 1942	30 April 1945	NSDAP	
Reich Minister of the Reichswehr (from 21 May 1935, Reich Minister of War)	Werner von Blomberg	30 January 1933	4 February 1938	Independent	
Reich Minister of Economics	Alfred Hugenberg	30 January 1933	29 June 1933	DNVP	
Reich Minister of Economics	Kurt Schmitt	29 June 1933	3 August 1934	NSDAP	
Reich Minister of Economics	Hjalmar Schacht	3 August 1934	26 November 1937	Independent	
Reich Minister of Economics	Hermann Göring	26 November 1937	15 January 1938	NSDAP	
Reich Minister of Economics	Walther Funk	5 February 1938	30 April 1945	NSDAP	
Reich Minister for Food and Agriculture	Alfred Hugenberg	30 January 1933	29 June 1933	DNVP	
Reich Minister for Food and Agriculture	Richard Walther Darré (On extended leave from 23 May 1942)	29 June 1933	6 April 1944	NSDAP	
Reich Minister for Food and Agriculture	Herbert Backe (Acting from 23 May 1942)	6 April 1944	30 April 1945	NSDAP	
Reich Minister of Labour	Franz Seldte	30 January 1933	30 April 1945	DNVP	
Reich Postal Minister	Paul Freiherr von Eltz-Rübenach	30 January 1933	2 February 1937	Independent	
Reich Postal Minister	Wilhelm Ohnesorge	2 February 1937	30 April 1945	NSDAP	
Reich Minister of Transport	Paul Freiherr von Eltz-Rübenach	30 January 1933	2 February 1937	Independent	
Reich Minister of Transport	Julius Dorpmüller	2 February 1937	30 April 1945	Independent	
Reich Minister of Public Enlightenment and Propaganda	Joseph Goebbels	13 March 1933	30 April 1945	NSDAP	
Reich Minister of Aviation	Hermann Göring	5 May 1933	23 April 1945	NSDAP	
Reich Minister of Science, Education and Culture	Bernhard Rust	1 May 1934	30 April 1945	NSDAP	
Reich Minister for Church Affairs	Hanns Kerrl	16 July 1935	14 December 1941 #	NSDAP	
Reich Minister for Church Affairs	Hermann Muhs (Acting)	15 December 1941	30 April 1945	NSDAP	
Reich Minister for Armaments and Munitions (from 2 September 1943, for Armaments and War Production)	Fritz Todt	17 March 1940	8 February 1942 ‽	NSDAP	
Reich Minister for Armaments and Munitions (from 2 September 1943, for Armaments and War Production)	Albert Speer	8 February 1942	30 April 1945	NSDAP	
Reich Minister for the Occupied Eastern Territories	Alfred Rosenberg	17 July 1941	30 April 1945	NSDAP	
Reich Ministers without portfolio (Reichsminister ohne Geschäftsbereich) (before 1938)	Hermann Göring (Reichskommissar for Air Traffic)	30 January 1933	28 April 1933	NSDAP	
Reich Ministers without portfolio (Reichsminister ohne Geschäftsbereich) (before 1938)	Ernst Röhm (Stabschef of the SA)	1 December 1933	1 July 1934 (executed)	NSDAP	
Reich Ministers without portfolio (Reichsminister ohne Geschäftsbereich) (before 1938)	Rudolf Hess (Deputy Führer)	1 December 1933	12 May 1941	NSDAP	
Reich Ministers without portfolio (Reichsminister ohne Geschäftsbereich) (before 1938)	Hanns Kerrl (First Deputy President of the Reichstag)	17 June 1934	16 July 1935	NSDAP	
Reich Ministers without portfolio (Reichsminister ohne Geschäftsbereich) (before 1938)	Hans Frank (Governor-General of Occupied Poland from 1939)	19 December 1934	30 April 1945	NSDAP	
Reich Ministers without portfolio (Reichsminister ohne Geschäftsbereich) (before 1938)	Hjalmar Schacht (President of the Reichsbank to 1939)	26 November 1937	22 January 1943	NSDAP	
Reich Ministers without portfolio (Reichsminister ohne Geschäftsbereich) (before 1938)	Hans Lammers (Chief of the Reich Chancellery)	26 November 1937	23 April 1945	NSDAP	
Reich Ministers (from 1938)	Konstantin von Neurath (Reich Protector of Bohemia-Moravia, 1939-43)	4 February 1938	30 April 1945	NSDAP	
Reich Ministers (from 1938)	Arthur Seyss-Inquart (Reichskommissar of the Netherlands from 1940)	1 May 1939	30 April 1945	NSDAP	
Reich Ministers (from 1938)	Wilhelm Frick (Reich Protector of Bohemia-Moravia, 1943-5)	24 August 1943	30 April 1945	NSDAP	
Reich Ministers (from 1938)	Konstantin Hierl (Chief of the Reich Labour Service)	24 August 1943	30 April 1945	NSDAP	
Members with cabinet rank and authority but without the formal title of Reichsminister	Günther Gereke (Reichskommissar for Employment)	30 January 1933	30 March 1933	Independent	
Members with cabinet rank and authority but without the formal title of Reichsminister	Werner von Fritsch (Commander-in-Chief of the Army)	20 April 1936	4 February 1938	Independent	
Members with cabinet rank and authority but without the formal title of Reichsminister	Erich Raeder (Commander-in-Chief of the Navy)	20 April 1936	30 January 1943	Independent	
Members with cabinet rank and authority but without the formal title of Reichsminister	Otto Meissner (Minister of State and Chief of the Presidential Chancellery)	1 December 1937	30 April 1945	NSDAP	
Members with cabinet rank and authority but without the formal title of Reichsminister	Wilhelm Keitel (Chief of the OKW)	4 February 1938	30 April 1945	Independent	
Members with cabinet rank and authority but without the formal title of Reichsminister	Walther von Brauchitsch (Commander-in-Chief of the Army)	4 February 1938	19 December 1941	Independent	
Members with cabinet rank and authority but without the formal title of Reichsminister	Martin Bormann (Chief of the Nazi Party Chancellery)	29 May 1941	30 April 1945	NSDAP	
Members with cabinet rank and authority but without the formal title of Reichsminister	Karl Dönitz (Commander-in-Chief of the Navy)	30 January 1943	30 April 1945	Independent	
Members with cabinet rank and authority but without the formal title of Reichsminister	Karl Hermann Frank (Minister of State for the Protectorate of Bohemia-Moravia)	20 August 1943	30 April 1945	NSDAP	

== Timeline of cabinet changes ==
- March 1933: Joseph Goebbels enters the cabinet as Reich Minister of Public Enlightenment and Propaganda;
- March 1933: Günther Gereke is arrested and dismissed as Reichskommissar for Employment;
- April 1933: Franz Seldte leaves the German National People's Party and becomes a member of the Nazi Party;
- May 1933: Hermann Göring takes a portfolio as Reich Minister of Aviation;
- June 1933: Kurt Schmitt succeeds Alfred Hugenberg as Reich Minister of Economics. Richard Walther Darré succeeds Hugenberg as Reich Minister for Food and Agriculture;
- December 1933: Ernst Röhm and Rudolf Hess enter the cabinet as Reich Ministers without Portfolio;
- May 1934: Bernhard Rust enters the cabinet as Reich Minister of Science, Education and Culture;
- June 1934: Hanns Kerrl enters the cabinet as a Reich Minister without Portfolio;
- July 1934: Röhm, Reich Minister without Portfolio, is murdered;
- July 1934: Göring (already a Reich Minister) is also granted cabinet rank as the Reichsforstmeister in the Reich Forestry Office;
- August 1934: Vice-Chancellor Franz von Papen leaves the cabinet. A new vice-chancellor is not installed;
- August 1934: Hjalmar Schacht succeeds Schmitt as Reich Minister of Economics;
- December 1934: Hans Frank enters the cabinet as a Reich Minister without portfolio;
- March 1935: Göring takes another portfolio as Commander-in-Chief of the Luftwaffe;
- May 1935: The title of Reich Minister of Defense is replaced by that of Reich Minister of War. Werner von Blomberg retains the office;
- July 1935: Kerrl takes a portfolio as Reich Minister of Church Affairs;
- April 1936: Werner von Fritsch, Commander-in-Chief of the Army, and Erich Raeder, Commander-in-Chief of the Navy, are granted cabinet rank;
- January 1937: Blomberg, Fritsch, Gürtner, Krosigk, Meissner, Neurath, Raeder, and Schacht accept the Golden Party Badge and become members of the Nazi Party. Eltz-Rubenach refuses and is forced to resign;
- February 1937: Wilhelm Ohnesorge succeeds Eltz-Rübenach as Reich Minister of Posts. Julius Dorpmüller succeeds Eltz-Rübenach as Reich Minister of Transport;
- November 1937: Göring succeeds Schacht as Reich Minister of Economics. Schacht becomes a Reich Minister without portfolio;
- November 1937: Hans Lammers, Chief of the Reich Chancellery, becomes a Reich Minister without portfolio;
- December 1937: Otto Meissner is granted cabinet rank as Minister of State and Head of the Presidential Chancellery;
- February 1938: Walther Funk succeeds Göring as Reich Minister of Economics;
- February 1938: Joachim von Ribbentrop replaces Neurath as Minister of Foreign Affairs. Neurath remains a Reich Minister (without portfolio);
- February 1938: Blomberg resigns as Reich Minister of War and his office is abolished. General Wilhelm Keitel, Chief of the High Command of the Armed Forces (OKW), is granted cabinet rank;
- February 1938: Walther von Brauchitsch succeeds Fritsch as Commander-in-Chief of the Army and is granted cabinet rank;
- April 1939: Brauchitsch and Keitel accept the Golden Party Badge;
- May 1939: Arthur Seyss-Inquart enters the cabinet as a Reich Minister (without portfolio);
- March 1940: Fritz Todt enters the cabinet as Reich Minister of Armaments and Munitions;
- January 1941: Franz Schlegelberger succeeds Gürtner as acting Reich Minister of Justice;
- February 1941: Dorpmüller, Reich Minister of Transport, joins the Nazi Party;
- May 1941: Hess is dismissed from the cabinet;
- May 1941: Martin Bormann is granted cabinet rank as the Chief of the Nazi Party Chancellery;
- July 1941: Alfred Rosenberg enters the cabinet as Reich Minister for the Occupied Eastern Territories;
- December 1941: Kerrl, the Reich Minister of Church Affairs, dies. Hermann Muhs becomes acting Reich Minister;
- December 1941: Brauchitsch resigns as Commander-in-Chief of the Army. Hitler himself takes up the position;
- February 1942: Albert Speer succeeds Todt as Reich Minister of Armaments and Munitions;
- May 1942: Darré placed on extended leave of absence. Herbert Backe becomes acting Reich Minister of Food and Agriculture;
- August 1942: Otto Georg Thierack succeeds Schlegelberger as Reich Minister of Justice;
- January 1943: Karl Dönitz succeeds Raeder as Commander-in-Chief of the Navy and is granted cabinet rank;
- January 1943: Lammers appointed President of the Reich Cabinet (presides over the cabinet in Hitler's absence);
- January 1943: Schacht departs the cabinet;
- August 1943: Heinrich Himmler succeeds Frick as Reich Minister of the Interior. Frick remains a Reich Minister (without portfolio);
- August 1943: Konstantin Hierl enters the cabinet as a Reich Minister (without portfolio);
- August 1943: Karl Hermann Frank is granted cabinet rank as Minister of State for the Protectorate of Bohemia-Moravia;
- September 1943: Speer's ministerial authority is extended to cover the entire German war industry, and is elevated to Reich Minister of Armaments and War Production;
- January 1944: Dönitz accepts the Golden Party Badge and becomes a member of the Nazi Party;
- April 1944: Backe becomes Reich Minister of Food and Agriculture;
- April 1945: Göring and Lammers are forced to resign from the cabinet.

== End of the cabinet ==
The last meeting of Hitler's cabinet took place on 5 February 1938. As the Nazi government was disintegrating at the end of World War II, and following Hitler's death on 30 April 1945, it was succeeded by the short-lived Goebbels cabinet, which was itself replaced on 2 May by the cabinet of Schwerin von Krosigk, commonly known as the Flensburg Government.

== Postwar indictment and result of prosecutions ==
As part of the Reichsregierung (Reich Government), the Reich cabinet was indicted as a criminal organisation by the International Military Tribunal. It was ultimately adjudged at the conclusion of the Nuremberg trials not to be a criminal organisation.

With regard to the individual members, by the fall of the Nazi regime in May 1945, five members of the Reich cabinet had committed suicide (Hitler, Bormann, Himmler, Goebbels and Rust). Six others had already died (Eltz-Rübenach, Fritsch, Gürtner, Kerrl, Röhm and Todt). However, 15 surviving members of the cabinet were individually indicted and tried for war crimes by the IMT along with Martin Bormann, who was tried in absentia as he was thought to be still alive. Eight were sentenced to death (Bormann, Hans Frank, Frick, Göring, Keitel, Ribbentrop, Rosenberg and Seyss-Inquart); six were imprisoned (Dönitz, Funk, Hess, Neurath, Raeder and Speer) and two (Schacht and Papen) were acquitted.

An additional four cabinet members (Darré, Lammers, Meissner and Schwerin von Krosigk) were tried by a US military court in the subsequent Ministries Trial; all but Meissner were convicted and imprisoned. One (Schlegelberger) was tried in the Judges' Trial and imprisoned. One (Karl Hermann Frank) was tried by a Czech court and sentenced to death. Another five (Backe, von Blomberg, von Brauchitsch, Seldte and Thierack) died in Allied custody before being brought to trial. Finally, the remaining cabinet members, including some of those acquitted in the Allied trials, were brought before special German denazification courts, which categorised their level of guilt and determined whether punishment was warranted. Among those convicted under this process were Hierl, Papen and Schacht.
