= Karl Stingl =

Karl Stingl (29 July 1864 in Mitterteich – 9 November 1936 in Munich) was a German engineer, administrative official and politician of the Christian Convervative Bavarian People's Party during the era of the Weimar Republic.

== Life and career ==
After school, Stingle attended the Technical University of Munich to acquire a diploma in engineering. While studying, he joined the Cimbria München Burschenschaft in 1882. He started working for the Bavarian Postal Service in 1885 and was employed by the Bavarian Ministry of Transport in 1904. In 1910 he was promoted postal chief officer in Landshut. Starting in 1919, he led the postal division of the Ministry of Transport.

== Public Offices ==
Stingl was appointed State Secretary in 1920 and, in this capacity, served as head of the Munich division of the Reichspostministerium. During his tenure, the first automatic long-distance exchange with time and zone billing was put into operation in Weilheim, and the automatic operation of what was then Europe's largest direct-dialing system was completed in Munich.

From 22 November 1922 to 12 August 1923, and again from 15 January 1925 to 28 January 1927, he served as Reich Minister of Postal Affairs in the governments led by Reich Chancellors Wilhelm Cuno, Hans Luther, and Wilhelm Marx. During his second term in particular, he advocated for improving the economic management of the German Reichspost. Due to his special commitment to technical progress, the Technical University of Munich awarded him an honorary Doctor of Technical Sciences (Doctor of Engineering) in 1925.

When Stingl advocated for a stamp featuring Frederick the Great as part of a 1926 stamp series titled “Notable Men of German History”, it met with opposition from parties loyal to the Weimar Republic. Criticism even within his own party heralded the end of his political career. His successor as Reich Post Minister was Georg Schätzel. Stingl withdrew from politics and subsequently served on the supervisory boards of various companies for several years before passing away in 1936

== Honours ==
- Honorary Doctor of Technical Sciences (Dr.-Ing. h. c.)
- Karl-Stingl-Straße in Mitterteich

== Literature ==
- Helge Dvorak: Biographisches Lexikon der Deutschen Burschenschaft. Vol. I: Politiker. Sub-vol. 5: R–S. Winter, Heidelberg 2002, ISBN 3-8253-1256-9, pp. 523–524.
- Manfred Knedlik: Reichspostminister Dr. Karl Stingl. Ein Beitrag zur Postgeschichte der Weimarer Republik. In: Archiv für deutsche Postgeschichte. Heft 1/1992, ISSN 0003-8989, S. 46–52.
- Handwörterbuch des Postwesens;
  - 1. Edition; p. 612
  - 2. Edition; p. 698
