= Paul Freiherr von Eltz-Rübenach =

German politician (1875–1943)

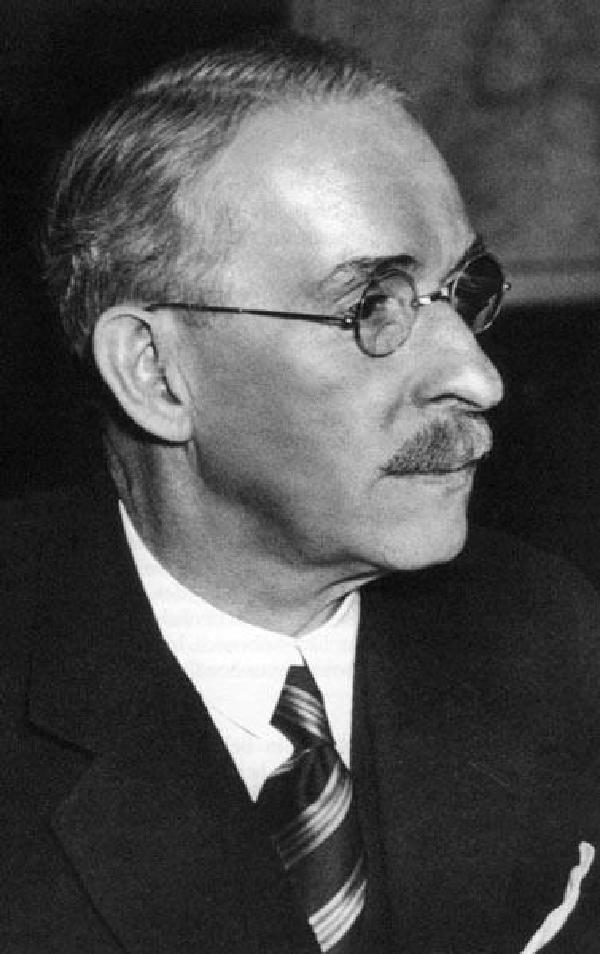

Reich Postal Minister
- In office 1 June 1932 – 2 February 1937
- Chancellor: Franz von Papen; Kurt von Schleicher; Adolf Hitler
- Preceded by: Georg Schätzel
- Succeeded by: Wilhelm Ohnesorge

Reich Minister of Transport
- In office 1 June 1932 – 2 February 1937
- Preceded by: Gottfried Treviranus
- Succeeded by: Julius Dorpmüller

Personal details
- Born: 9 February 1875 Wahn, Rhine Province, German Empire
- Died: 25 August 1943 (aged 68) Linz am Rhein, Rhine Province, Nazi Germany
- Education: Technische Hochschule Aachen; Technische Hochschule Charlottenburg
- Occupation: Architect

Peter Paul Freiherr von Eltz-Rübenach (9 February 1875 – 25 August 1943) was Reich Postal Minister (Reichspostminister) and Reich Minister of Transport (Reichsminister für Verkehr) of Germany between 1932 and 1937.

== Early life ==
Eltz-Rübenach was born in Wahn (today part of Cologne), a scion of the Rhenish noble house of Eltz. He studied engineering at the Technische Hochschulen in Aachen (now RWTH Aachen University) and in Charlottenburg (now Technische Universität Berlin) and was then employed by the state railroad service. He spent several years in the United States working from 1911 to 1914 as a technical expert in the German consulate in New York City. At the outbreak of World War I he returned to Germany and worked in military rail transport. In 1924 he became president of the Deutsche Reichsbahn Board in Karlsruhe.

== Political career ==
On 1 June 1932, he was appointed Reichsminister for both the Reich Ministry of Transport and the Reich Postal Ministry as a nonpartisan technocrat in Chancellor Franz von Papen's "cabinet of barons." He retained both these portfolios in the cabinets formed by Chancellor Kurt von Schleicher (3 December 1932) and, after the Nazi Machtergreifung, by Adolf Hitler (30 January 1933). In the cabinet, he fought unsuccessfully for development of the railroads against the government's emphasis on developing an improved highway system, the Reichsautobahn. Eltz-Rübenach also served as a member of the Academy for German Law.

To mark the fourth anniversary of the Nazi regime, Hitler determined to enroll all the remaining non-Nazi ministers in the Nazi Party and to confer upon them the Golden Party Badge. Eltz-Rübenach, a devout Catholic, was troubled by the rising conflict between the Nazi government and the Catholic Church. At the cabinet meeting on 30 January 1937, Eltz-Rübenach rejected the Golden Party Badge personally offered by Hitler and demanded a statement of Hitler's proposed policy toward the Church. The other ministers sat in stunned silence as Eltz-Rübenach was required to submit his resignation.

Some time later, when his wife refused to accept the Golden Party Badge, a Nazi decoration, he and his family became "suspect persons" and were placed under surveillance by the Gestapo. In addition, his pension claims were temporarily revoked.

Eltz-Rübenach died in Linz am Rhein in 1943, aged 68.
