= Postschutz =

Postal Protection
- SS-Postschutz
- Founded: 1933
- Disbanded: 1945
- Country: Nazi Germany
- Type: Paramilitary
- Part of: Reichspost; SS Main Office

Postschutz (transl. Postal Protection), after 1942 SS-Postschutz, was a paramilitary unit of Reichspost with a mission to protect post office installations from armed attacks.

== Origins ==
The Postschutz was created in 1933 in order to protect the establishments of the German Post Office from communist attacks. In 1942 the Postschutz was put under the command of the Allgemeine SS, becoming the SS-Postschutz with Gottlob Berger as military leader, and subordinated to the supervision of the SS-Hauptamt. The uniform became a field grey version of the Allgemeine SS uniform, with SS rank insignia.

== Personnel ==
At the end of 1933 26,000 postal employees had volunteered for the Postschutz. In 1937 an agreement between the Wehrmacht and the Postmaster General Wilhelm Ohnesorge established that in time of war 29,000 men from the Reichspost would be reserved for the Postschutz. In 1939 the Postschutz contained 40 000 men, and was also in charge of air raid precautions for the Reichspost. All male postal employees could become volunteer members of the Postschutz. For all new employees under the age of 35 it was mandatory. Training took place at eight schools, that annually held courses for 20 000 members of the Postschutz. All were issued firearms.

== Military actions ==
In 1942 units from the SS-Postschutz staffed the Fronthilfe der Deutschen Reichspost, motor coach units operating with front units of the Waffen-SS. In 1944 the Fronthilfe contained a HQ, five battalions, a motor depot, and about 7,000 men. Members of the SS-Postschutz were also drafted into SS-Sicherungs-Bataillone der Deutschen Reichspost (SS-security battalions of the German post office), combating partisans in occupied Slovenia and Belorussia.

== Ranks ==
Collar insignia	Shoulder insignia	Postschutz Rank	Translation	SS equivalent
		Oberführer	Senior leader	Obersturmbannführer
		Bezirksführer	District leader	Sturmbannführer
		Abschnittsführer	Section leader	Hauptsturmführer
		Abteilungshauptführer	Senior department leader	Obersturmführer
		Abteilungsführer	Department leader	Untersturmführer
		Zughauptführer	Senior platoon leader	Hauptscharführer
		Zugführer	Platoon leader	Oberscharführer
		Gruppenhauptführer	Senior group leader	Scharführer
		Gruppenführer	Group leader	Unterscharführer
		Truppführer	Troop leader	Rottenführer
		Rottenführer	Foreman	Rottenführer
		Postschutzmann	Postal Protection man	Mann
