= Reich Forestry Office =

Government agency responsible for forestry in Nazi Germany

The Reich Forestry Office (German: Reichsforstamt) was the highest authority for forestry, hunting, timber management, nature conservation, and the preservation of natural monuments in Nazi Germany. It was established by the Law on the Transition of Forestry and Hunting to the Reich, which was passed unanimously by the Reich government on 3 July 1934. Its aim was to preserve forested areas due to their importance to the nation's culture and industry.

At the head of the authority was the Reichsforstmeister (Reich chief forester) with the rank of Reichsminister, though in hunting-related matters the designation Reichsjägermeister (Reich chief hunter) was used. The various regional forest offices were made subordinate to the new authority. Forestry and hunting were spun off from the Reich Ministry of Food and Agriculture in 1934 and placed under the Reich Forestry Office. In 1935 it was merged with the Prussian State Forest Office.

== Literature ==
- Dirscherl, Stefan: Tier- und Naturschutz im Nationalsozialismus, Göttingen: V & R Unipress, 2012, S. 73–75 (ISBN 978-3-8471-0029-4).
- Rubner, Heinrich: Deutsche Forstgeschichte 1933-1945: Forstwirtschaft, Jagd, und Umwelt im NS-Staat, St. Katharinen: Scripta-Mercaturae-Verl., 1985 (ISBN 3-922661-24-6).
- How Green Were the Nazis? Nature, Environment and Nation in the Third Reich Edited by Franz-Josef Brüggemeier, Mark Cioc, and Thomas Zeller. Athens: Ohio University Press, 2005
