= Wilhelm Ohnesorge =

German Nazi politician (1872–1962)

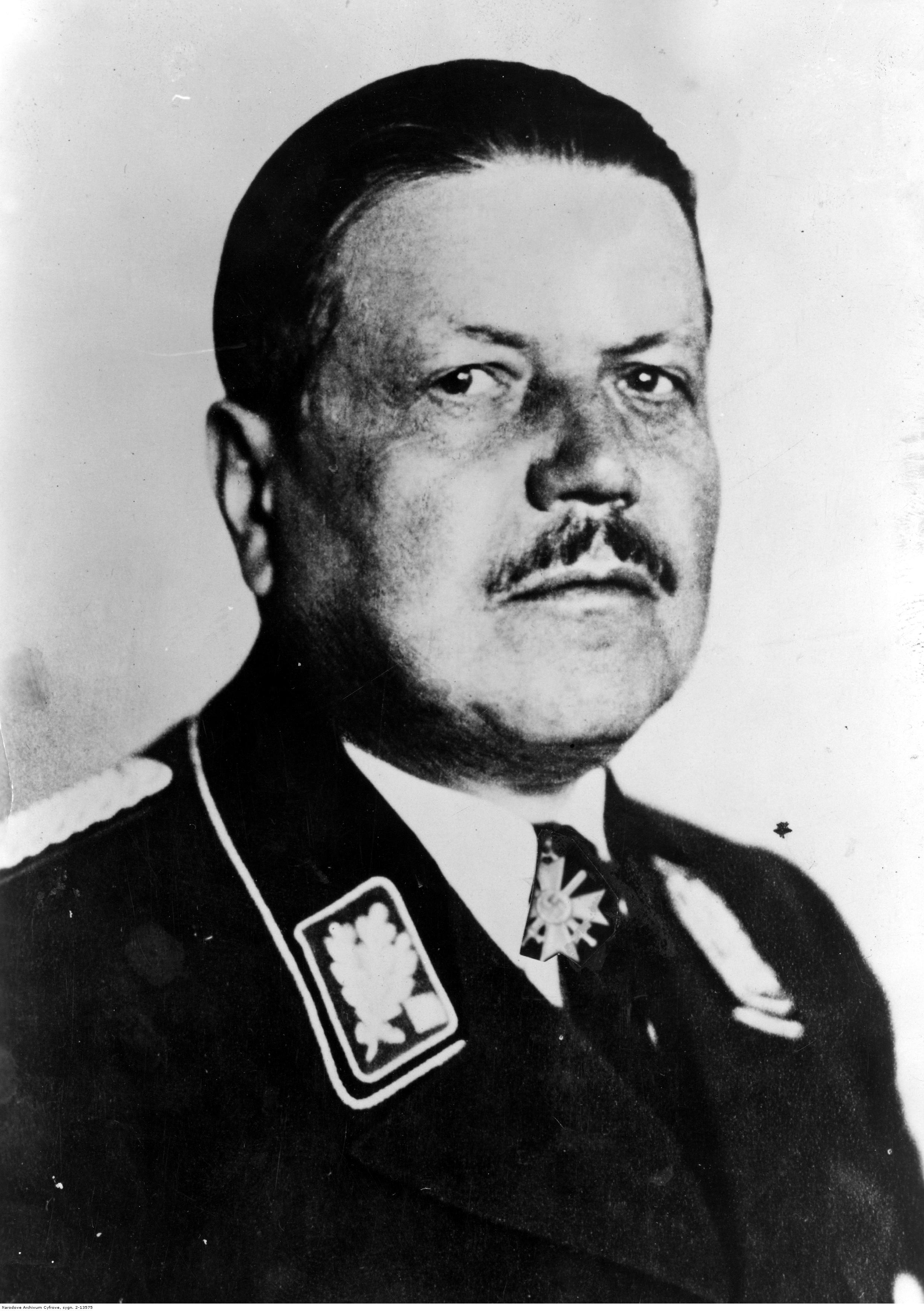

Reich Postal Minister
- In office 2 February 1937 – 30 April 1945
- Chancellor: Adolf Hitler
- Preceded by: Paul Freiherr von Eltz-Rübenach
- Succeeded by: Julius Dorpmüller

State Secretary Reich Postal Ministry
- In office 1 March 1933 – 2 February 1937

Personal details
- Born: Karl Wilhelm Ohnesorge; 8 June 1872 Gräfenhainichen, Province of Saxony, German Empire
- Died: 1 February 1962 (aged 89) Munich, Bavaria, West Germany
- Party: Nazi Party
- Spouses: Elsbeth Marie Ebert (m. 1897; died 1915); Margarethe Adler (m. 1915; died 1952); Auguste Videcnik (m. 1940; died 2008)
- Children: Lotti Ohnesorge
- Education: Kiel University; Humboldt University of Berlin
- Occupation: Postal Manager
- Civilian awards: Golden Party Badge

Military service
- Allegiance: German Empire; Nazi Germany
- Branch/service: Imperial German Army; NSKK
- Years of service: 1914–1918 (Army); 1937–1945 (NSKK)
- Rank: Oberstleutnant (Army); Obergruppenführer (NSKK)
- Commands: Chief, Telegraph Directorate (1915-1918)
- Battles/wars: World War I
- Military awards: Iron Cross (1st Class); Iron Cross (2nd Class)

Karl Wilhelm Ohnesorge (8 June 1872 – 1 February 1962) was a German politician in Nazi Germany who sat in the Hitler cabinet. From 1937 to 1945, he was the Reichsminister of the Reich Postal Ministry, having succeeded Paul Freiherr von Eltz-Rübenach. Along with his ministerial duties, Ohnesorge also significantly delved into research relating to propagation and promotion of the Nazi Party through the radio, initiatives in German signals intelligence (SIGINT), including the interception of Anglo-American communications via the research department of the Reichspost, and the development of a proposed German atomic bomb.

== Early life and education ==
Born in Gräfenhainichen, in the Prussian Province of Saxony, Ohnesorge was the son of Johann Ferdinand Ohnesorge (1837–1924), a former sergeant major in the 6th Dragoon Regiment and later a senior telegraph assistant, and Ida Franziska Auguste (1845–1897) from Bismark.

Ohnesorge was educated in Frankfurt and, after graduating from high school in 1890, entered the local telegraph office as a trainee. In 1897, after attending the Postal and Telegraph School in Berlin, he passed the higher administrative examination. He then studied mathematics and physics at the universities of Kiel and Berlin. From 1900, he was employed in Berlin at the Telegraph Experimental Office, the Telephone Exchange, and the Higher Postal Directorate (OPD).

== World War I and early post-war life ==
Ohnesorge served in the Imperial German Army throughout World War I, from 1914 to 1918. He initially served as a communications officer at the Supreme Army Command; from August 1915, he headed the Telegraph Directorate of the supreme headquarters with the rank of Oberstleutnant. In 1915, he developed the "Ohnesorge four-wire circuit," which enabled the first telephone connection between the western front at Charleville-Mézières and Constantinople. During his war service, he was awarded the Iron Cross, 1st and 2nd class. Following the war, from 1919 to 1924, he worked at the OPD in Dortmund. During the occupation of the Ruhr in 1923, he maintained telephone connections with the unoccupied part of the German Reich in defiance of Allied prohibitions. As a result, he was appointed department head at the Berlin Postal Directorate. During this period, he became increasingly involved in right-wing politics and joined the Deutschvölkischer Schutz- und Trutzbund, the largest, most active and most influential antisemitic organization in the Weimar Republic.

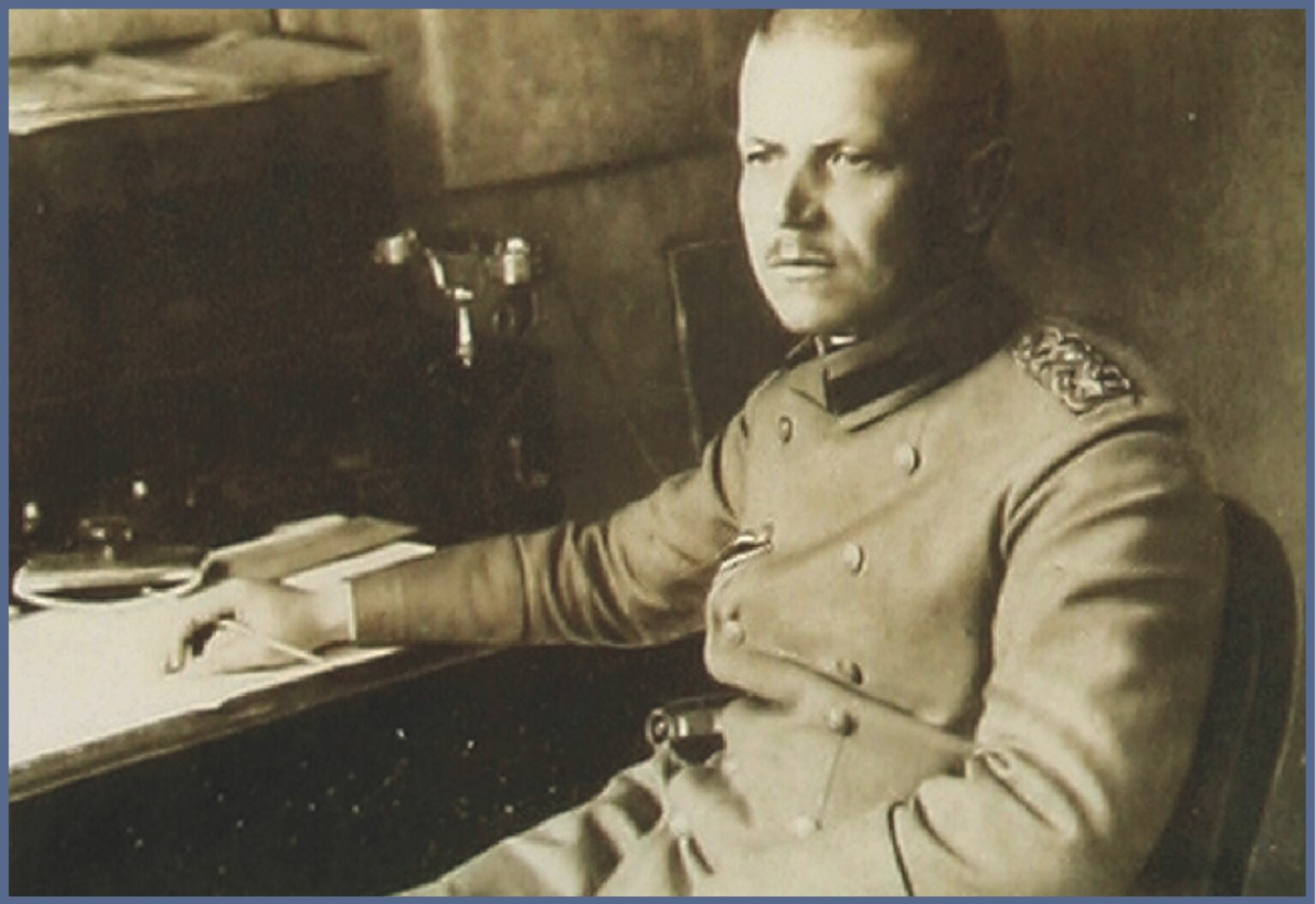
Oberstleutnant Ohnesorge, head of the Telegraph Directorate of the Supreme Army Command, c. 1915

== Nazi Party postal career ==
Ohnesorge first met Adolf Hitler in 1920, and they developed a close relationship. Shortly after this, Ohnesorge joined the Nazi Party, becoming the first non-Bavarian to join the NSDAP (membership number 42) and founding its first local branch (Ortsgruppe) outside Bavaria, at Dortmund. He established further local groups in Iserlohn, Altena, and Hagen. Hans Hinkel recalled Ohnesorge collaborating in Dortmund with Wilhelm Kolm, a former Freikorps fighter who provided a small protective force for the nascent local Nazi group. Ohnesorge was committed to the extent that he hosted members of Kolm’s unit at his home. As an early Party member. he later would be awarded the Golden Party Badge. His achievements in converting the Berlin telephone network from a manual switchboard system to automatic dialing led to his appointment, in September 1929, as head of the Reichspostzentralamt, the development center for telecommunications technology in Berlin.

Two days after the 27 February 1933 Reichstag fire, Ohnesorge was made the Technical State Secretary in the Reich Postal Ministry, and by the July following the March 1933 German federal election, had taken over the office of Acting State Secretary of the German Reich Postal Service. Due to a number of resignations, he was left as the sole assistant to Reich Postal Minister Paul Freiherr von Eltz-Rübenach.

As Reich Postal Secretary, Ohnesorge was acknowledged for his support of emerging television technology. Eugen Hadamovsky, director of the Reich Broadcasting Company, specifically thanked Ohnesorge for his “vigorous support of television” during the launch of the first official German television broadcasts from the Paul Nipkow station in Berlin-Witzleben in March 1935.

During this period, Ohnesorge was particularly engaged in the propagation of the Nazi Party and its goals through the post, especially in relation to Adolf Hitler's cult of personality and the dissemination of antisemitism. In 1937, he was appointed the Reichsminister of the Postal Ministry, following Eltz-Rübenach's forced resignation due to his questioning of the suppression of the Catholic Church by the Nazis.

Additionally, in 1937, Ohnesorge was appointed an honorary rank within the National Socialist Motor Corps, a distinction granted to high-ranking officials who had rendered service to the corps or from whom the NSKK leadership sought to gain support for its interests. Other officials similarly appointed included Wilhelm Frick, Franz Xaver Schwarz, and Roland Freisler.

Between 1933 and 1937, 10 percent of all senior officials were required to leave the Reichspost. In the lower ranks, nearly three thousand new employees entered the service in the first year, many former Sturmabteilung (SA) and Schutzstaffel (SS) members. By 1937, compulsory NSDAP membership was required of newly appointed senior officials. This aided in the efforts of the Nazi government to increase support and control through the postal and telecommunication services and facilitated Gestapo operations. Under Ohnesorge's leadership, the censorship of foreign mail began, with the scale of surveillance continuing to increase throughout the 1930s. Preparations for a wartime transition began in 1935, leading to the first formal tests of wartime and civil postal protocols in 1937. As Reichsminister, Ohnesorge moved beyond technical ministerial administration to advocate for radicalized measures against Jewish citizens. In November 1939, he opposed Hans Pfundtner's draft proposal to reduce pension payments to Jewish people, instead commenting in favour of their immediate cessation. He justified this stance on antisemitic grounds, as well as expressing his expectation that the Jewish population would be placed in custody, security arrest, "or the like" for the duration of the war.

In 1938, following the Anschluss of Austria the Reichspost under Wilhelm Ohnesorge expanded to absorb the Austrian postal and telegraphic administration, as well as the property of the Österreichische Postsparkasse.

== World War II and the German atomic bomb programme ==
In addition to its routine work, the research department of the Reichspost took over some important military research, including enciphering and radar development providing the ministry extra political weight. Ohnesorge, at this point, was a known capable technician and contributed heavily to research towards a German atomic bomb. He directed the research and development institute within the ministry, and founded new post office research institutes at Kleinmachnow and at Miersdorf to support the nuclear effort. He further ordered a large amount of Reichspost profits to fund and develop the nuclear programmes. In January 1940, Ohnesorge supported the project for the technical development of isotope separation led privately by Manfred von Ardenne, aiding in the finance and construction of a cyclotron. Additionally, he used his political influence to further the project and at least twice personally reported to Hitler on the progress and merits of the German atomic bomb programmes, along with discussions of his other ideas. A notable signals intelligence and cryptology success under his leadership of the ministry was the 1941 interception of communications between Franklin Roosevelt and Winston Churchill.

During the 1940s, Ohnesorge was a proponent of the integration of European Axis and Axis-aligned states' postal services through the foundation of the European Postal and Telegraph Union (EPTU), as a bulwark against Bolshevism. He privately justified the union to Hitler as a mechanism to economically exploit the occupied territories. During the administrative restructuring of annexed Reichsgau and conquered territories, Reich Postal Minister Wilhelm Ohnesorge lobbied to maintain the Reichspost as a "Special Administration" independent of local Nazi governors, showing concern for the broad powers and unified structures that would undermine his ministerial and financial influence. He argued that the technical complexity of telecommunications and the Post’s financial and historical self-sufficiency necessitated a centralized command in Berlin under himself rather than regional political control. Additionally, Ohnesorge’s friction extended to his ministry, especially in regard to regional presidents of the Reichspost; by 1941, the Reich Chancellery noted Ohnesorge had received the most internal complaints of all senior officials. One complaint was characterized by the encouragement of direct reporting from lower-level employees and the bypassing of traditional bureaucratic channels. Conversely, in 1941 Ohnesorge, edited and published a propaganda text for the Reichpost containing a significant amount of letters and anecdotes from lower ranking postal staff and former staff serving in the army praising him and his leadership, referring to him paternally and comparing the Reichspost favourably to other organisations, indicative of an attempt to encourage a sense of a cult of personality.

Ohnesorge was a vocal opponent of American-owned companies continuing to operate within Germany specifically, the International Telephone & Telegraph (ITT) corporation, arguing that its German subsidiaries should not remain under New York management during wartime. Ohnesorge lobbied for the Reich to acquire ITT’s shares, but his efforts were countered by Kurt von Schröder and Walter Schellenberg, who secured protection for ITT from the Gestapo in exchange for increased payments from the Circle of Friends (Freundeskreis der Wirtschaft). Ohnesorge appealed directly to Hitler, denouncing ITT representative Gerhardt Westrick as an American sympathizer. However, Hitler supported the existing corporate arrangements due to ITT's importance to the German economy. Undeterred, Ohnesorge attempted in 1942 to induce Heinrich Himmler to sign a warrant for Westrick's arrest on charges of high treason, with the intent of placing him in a concentration camp while the Reichspost disposed of ITT’s shares. Once again, intervention by Schröder and Schellenberg prevented the arrest.

This hostility toward ITT and its linked figures intersected with the July 20 plot to assassinate Hitler in 1944, as General Erich Fellgiebel and General Fritz Thiele of the Signal Corps both had professional ties to ITT. When the plot failed, Ohnesorge's long-standing warnings were validated; Ohnesorge utilized the moment of crisis to once again attempt the confiscation of ITT’s German assets. Ohnesorge's campaign against foreign influence similarly targeted Eduard Winter, head of the General Motors Adam-Opel unit, who was arrested in April 1942 on suspicion of American espionage after falling foul of the Reichsminister. As with the ITT matter, Himmler eventually intervened to secure Winter's release, though Ohnesorge continued to push for the removal of American influence from the Reich's infrastructure.

Ohnesorge fled Berlin on 10 April 1945 and, according to one source, made contact with the Flensburg Government but was informed by Grand Admiral Karl Dönitz that his services were not required, and he was advised to surrender to the Allied forces. According to one contemporary newspaper report, Ohnesorge was captured by the U.S. Seventh Army, reportedly in Bad Gastein, Austria, alongside the Japanese ambassador Hiroshi Ōshima and two hundred German ministerial personnel. Regardless, in May 1945, he was subsequently interrogated by the Seventh Army Intelligence Center. Although contemporary intelligence reports highlighted his deep involvement with the Nazi regime, by June 1945, U.S. military intelligence had reassessed him as a "better type of German official", claiming he had attempted to resist Nazi influence within the Reichspost.

== Post-war denazification and death ==
During denazification proceedings after the war, charges were brought against him as a leading member of the Party. He spent several years in various prisoner-of-war camps and was questioned as a witness at the Nuremberg Trials.

Ohnesorge was interrogated by the Office of the U.S. Chief of Counsel for War Crimes in March and April 1947 in relation to the formation of the Postschutz, a volunteer paramilitary organization involved in the protection of railroad and Reichspost infrastructure, and its later operations as the SS-Postschutz under Gottlob Berger. Berger was subsequently indicted for war crimes in November 1947. Ohnesorge was mentioned during both the Pohl trial and throughout the Ministries Trial but faced no indictment at Nuremburg himself.

An initial denazification proceeding in June 1948 classified Ohnesorge as Category II ("offender") and sentenced him to three years in a labor camp with forfeiture of assets above 10,000 Deutsche Mark. In April 1949, the Appeals Chamber for Upper Bavaria reclassified him as Category I ("major offender") and imposed monetary penalties, though the jail sentence was overturned. By 1949, Ohnesorge was residing in Ellbech near Bad Tolz. In 1951, he moved to a farm in the neighboring village of Kirchbichl, but left the region for Munich in 1954, where he attempted to continue work on technical matters. In 1955, he succeeded in having his previous verdict overturned and the proceedings discontinued, subsequently being granted the retirement benefits of a president of the Reich Postal Central Office. He died at the age of 89 on 1 February 1962 in Munich.

== Personal life ==
Ohnesorge was married three times. In 1897, he married Elsbeth Marie Ebert (1874–1915), the child of a Privy Senior Postal Councillor, with whom he had four daughters. Following the death of his first wife, he married Margarethe Adler (1885–1952) in 1915; while it is not recorded when, or the cause of the end of his second marriage, Ohnesorge is recorded attending a public postal event in December 1937 with a woman described as his wife by contemporary media. In 1940, he married his third wife, Auguste Videcnik (1912-2008), with whom he had one son and two daughters.

== Sources ==
- Bad Tölz Municipal Archives, 1949 Address Book Wilhelm Ohnesorge 1949 Post-War Residency
- Books: Disposition Of Books Of Former German Institutes And Nazistic Libraries
- De Boer, S. J. Escaping Hitler's Bunker: The Fate of the Third Reich's Leaders. Pen & Sword Books, United Kingdom, 2021.*Central Intelligence Agency.* "Manfred Baron von Ardenne." June 30, 1955, p. 2. CIA-RDP80-00810A007200600003-6. CIA FOIA Reading Room.
- Doerries, Reinhard R. (2009). Hitler's Intelligence Chief: Walter Schellenberg. New York: Enigma Books. p. 91. ISBN 978-1-929631-77-3.
- Higham, Charles (1983). Trading with the Enemy: An Exposé of the Secret Nazi-American Money Plot 1933–1949. Delacorte Press. pp. 9–92. ISBN 978-0440090649.
- Hydrick, Carter P. (2016). Critical Mass: How Nazi Germany Surrendered Enriched Uranium for the United States' Atomic Bomb (3rd ed.). Waterville, OR: Trine Day. ISBN 978-1-63424-117-5.
- Kahn, David (1996). The Codebreakers: The Story of Secret Writing (Revised ed.). Macmillan. pp. 292–293. ISBN 978-0684831305.
- (in German) Rainer Karlsch: Hitlers Bombe. DVA München, 2005. ISBN 3-421-05809-1.
- Karlsch, Rainer; Zeman, Zbynek (2008). Uranium Matters: Central European Uranium in International Politics, 1900-1960. Central European University Press. pp. 12–13. ISBN 9789639776005.
- Kirchbichl Municipal Records, 1954 Meldekarte for Wilhelm Ohnesorge Wilhelm Ohnesorge 1954 Post-War Residency, page 2
- Lohalm, Uwe (1970). Völkischer Radikalismus: die Geschichte des Deutschvölkischen Schutz- und Trutz-Bundes, 1919-1923. Hamburg: Leibniz-Verlag. ISBN 978-3-874-73000-6.
- Lotz, Wolfgang (1999). "Ohnesorge, Wilhelm". Neue Deutsche Biographie. Vol. 19. pp. 494–495.
- Mayntz, Renate; Hughes, Thomas P., eds. (1988). The Development of Large Technical Systems. Schriften des Max-Planck-Instituts für Gesellschaftsforschung Köln. Vol. 2. Frankfurt am Main: Campus Verlag. p. 198. ISBN 3-593-34032-1.
- Newspaper clippings about Wilhelm Ohnesorge in the 20th Century Press Archives of the ZBW
- Proschmann, Sabrina (2022). Creating the 'New Europe' through Postal Services: Setting Postal Standards during World War II. Baden‑Baden: Nomos Verlagsgesellschaft. p. 64.
- Wilhelm Ohnesorge: Die Deutsche Reichspost in Geschichte und Gegenwart. 1941.
- Wilhelm Ohnesorge (postal official)
