= Dankeskirche, Sebaldsbrück =

Church in Germany, subject of a political scandal

Coordinates: 53°03′51″N 08°53′44″E

The Dankeskirche ('Thanksgiving Church') was a small Protestant church in Sebaldsbrück, a suburb of the German city of Bremen. The church was consecrated in 1938, which was preceded by a political dispute over its intended name. Bishop Heinrich Weidemannwanted to name the church after Horst Wessel, a move which was fiercely resisted by the local National Socialist party hierarchy. The church was demolished in 1964–1965.

== Background ==
In 1834 the Protestants in Sebaldsbrück were included in the Horner Kirche. But in the 1930s the population of Sebaldsbrück was growing rapidly. For the Sebaldsbrück Protestants there were significant distances to attend mass at the churches in Horn and Oberneuland, prompting the need for the building of a church closer to the parishioners.

The regional bishop Heinrich Weidemann of the Evangelical Church of Bremen took the initiative to build new churches in Sebaldsbrück, Osterholz and Gröpelingen. Notably Weidemann was a fanatical advocate of the German Christian movement, promoting syncretism between National Socialism and Christianity. He wished to name the new Sebaldsbrück church as the Horst-Wessel-Gedächtniskirche ('Horst Wessel Memorial Church'), in honour of National Socialist martyr Horst Wessel. The church to be built in Osterholtz, on the other hand, was supposed to be named after Paul von Hindenburg.

== Beginning of construction ==
The cornerstone for the new church was laid on 9 October 1937, on the occasion of Horst Wessel's 30th birthday. Weidemann named his loyal follower Paul Fehsenfeld as the pastor of the Sebaldsbrück church. The planned inauguration of the new church was scheduled for 21 March 1938 (the anniversary of the Potsdam Day). Adolf Hitler was personally invited to attend the inauguration.

== Naming controversy ==
The unusual naming proposal proved controversial. Weidemann had received a verbal approval of the name 'Horst Wessel Memorial Church' over telephone from his old friend Hermann Muhs at the Reich Ministry for Church Affairs on 9 October 1937. The proposed name provoked ire from the NSDAP, the SA, the SS and Carl Röver (Gauleiter and Reichsstatthalter). At a NSDAP rally held on 18 November 1937, the Bremen mayor Johann Heinrich Böhmcker spoke against the plans to name the church after Wessel. Böhmcker issued a decree, published in the official bulletin of Bremen on 3 December 1937, indicating that Weidemann's plans would be considered unlawful.

Weidemann's opponents invoked the first paragraph of the Law on Protection of National Symbols of 19 May 1933, as their formal justification for their position. For NSDAP leaders such as Röver and Böhmcker the project of fusing National Socialism and Christianity represented an unacceptable violation of the separation of church and state. Weidemann on his behalf would argue as Horst Wessel had grown up in a pastor's household (his father Ludwig Wessel had been a Protestant priest), he would have been 'one of their own'.

=== Bormann letter ===
Whilst Röver and Böhmcker were the local political heavy-weights, they had underestimated Weidemann's clout. Seemingly Weidemann prepared for this confrontation, for example by seeking donations for building the Horst Wessel Memorial Church from Hitler, Hermann Göring and Viktor Lutze (police chief of Hanover). On 3 December 1937, Martin Bormann sent a letter to Röver and Böhmcker instructing them to stay away from church matters.

=== Awaiting Anschluss and expulsion of Weidemann ===
Böhmcker, in correspondence, expressed dismay over the decision. Per Reijo Heinonen (1978) the Sebaldsbrück church naming issue attracted the attention from the national-level leadership ahead of Anschluss with Austria. The Protestant church in Austria was closer to the NSDAP, and thus Heinonen argues that the party leadership was keen to not anger the Austrian Protestant church ahead of Anschluss. Notably the party leaders in Bremen were instructed not to interfere on the church issue before 30 April 1938.

On 14 March 1938, with the approval of Röver, local authorities expelled Weidemann from the Bremen City Council and the NSDAP as well as forcing Weidemann to pay a fine.

=== Backlash from Berlin ===
The behaviour of Röver during the church naming dispute caused worries among leaders in Berlin, fearing a backlash from religious sectors. Röver had allegedly referred to Christianity as 'shit', having argued that his sole God was Adolf Hitler and having proposed that the Sebaldsbrück church would better be named after David or Joseph. On 27 April 1938, Reich Minister for Church Affairs Hanns Kerrl wrote to Head of Reich Chancellery Hans Lammers, stating that Röver's behaviour was politically dangerous and that the actions taken against Weidemann had been unjustified. On 3 June 1938, Lammers informed Weidemann that the measures taken against him would be reversed. Moreover Hitler reprimanded Röver for his behaviour.

=== Hitler intervenes ===
Eventually, Hitler intervened to settle the dispute by issuing the 6 August 1938, Führer decree 'On the Naming of Churches after Pioneers of the National Socialist Movement' through which he requested church authorities across Germany "that church buildings not be named after fighters and heroes of the National Socialist movement who are no longer among the living." There had been some internal reflection prior to issuing the decree on whether to release the decree to the public or not. In the end the decree was only circulated directly to church authorities. Per Siemens (2013) Hitler did not want the name of Horst Wessel (around whom a significant mythos had been created) to be dragged into the dispute over the role of the churches in Germany (Kirchenkampf).

=== Thanksgiving plaque ===
Weidemann remained confident in spite of the Führer decree. He opted to propose Dankeskirche ('Thanksgiving Church') as the new name for all of the three planned new churches in Sebaldsbrück, Osterholz and Gröpelingen. Weidemann managed to give an ideological overtone to this new proposed name. He informed Lammers of his intention to install a memorial plaque with the text "Thanksgiving Church. Built in gratitude to God for the miraculous salvation of our people from the abyss of Jewish-materialist Bolshevism through the actions of the Führer in the Year 1938 after Christ, in the 6th year of the National Socialist uprising." By framing thanksgiving in this way, Weidemann assigned Hitler a role of divine mediation. He asked Lammers if Hitler would object to the plaque, but there was never any reply indicating Hitler's opinion on the matter. However Lammers, after consulting with Reich Ministry for Church Affairs Director Julius Stahn, advised Weidemann to take possible political consequences into account. Röver and Böhmcker did not object to the new proposed name.

== Inauguration ==
The three new churches, all named Dankeskirche, were consecrated with Weidemann's plaques on 27 November 1938 (Advent Sunday). The Dankeskirche in Sebaldsbrück had the same design as that of Osterholtz, whilst the smaller church in Gröpelingen was made entirely of wood. Located on Sattelhof in the middle of Sebaldsbrück, the Dankeskirche contained priest's quarters and pastoral office upstairs and prayer hall downstairs. A pipe organ from the W. Sauer Orgelbaude in Frankfurt was installed. The Sebaldsbrück Dankeskirche functioned as a secondary church of the Horn Protestant parish.

Commenting on the inauguration of the three 'Thanksgiving Churches', the Bremer Kirchenzeitung ('Bremen Church Newspaper') wrote that "[t]he church thanks God from the bottom of its heart that he sent us at the last hour the man who put an end to the Jewish spiritual contamination of German people and through National Socialism ensured the spiritual awakening of our people. Thus, the Regional Bishop Dr. Weidemann of the Bremen Evangelical Church has given thanks by giving the three newly built churches the name 'Thanksgiving Church'. This means that a ring of thanks has been placed around the city of Bremen, with the three new churches as sworn witnesses to the fact that the Bremen church people, today and in future times, will never forget the historical truth of 1933."

== Later years ==
During the Second World War the Dankeskirche provided a sense of comfort and security for the local community. In 1948, the Protestants in Sebaldsbrück separated from the Horn parish and created their own parish. The congregation had an active life in the 1950s. In 1957, the building of community centre of the congregation, named Die Brücke, on a nearby plot on Sebaldsbrück Heerstrasse was completed. As the old Dankeskirche was becoming too small for the congregation and with the stigma of the church being nick-named as the 'Nazi church', the congregation resolved to build a new church in its stead. The Dankeskirche was demolished between 1964 and 1965. The new Church of Reconciliation, designed by architect Gerhard Müller-Menckens, was inaugurated in 1966. With the inauguration of the new church, the local congregation changed its name to the 'Evangelical Congregation of Reconciliation of Sebaldsbrück', seeking to break with the National Socialist legacy of its predecessor.

== See also ==
- Confessing Church
