= Adalbert Volck =

Adalbert Volck may refer to:

- Adalbert J. Volck (1828–1912), German-American dentist and caricaturist
- Adalbert Volck (Nazi Party official) (1868–1948)
