= Karl Dincklage =

German Nazi Party official

Deputy Gauleiter, Gau Southern Hanover-Brunswick
- In office 1 October 1928 – 7 October 1930
- Preceded by: Position established
- Succeeded by: Hermann Muhs

Deputy Gauleiter, Gau Hanover-North
- In office 27 March 1925 – 1 October 1928
- Preceded by: Position established
- Succeeded by: Position abolished

Deputy Supreme SA Leader-North
- In office 1 March 1928 – 7 October 1930
- Preceded by: Position established
- Succeeded by: Viktor Lutze

Personal details
- Born: 21 September 1874 Wilhelmshaven, Province of Hanover, Kingdom of Prussia, German Empire
- Died: 7 October 1930 (aged 56) Davos, Switzerland
- Party: Nazi Party (NSDAP)
- Other political affiliations: German National People's Party (DNVP); German Völkisch Freedom Party (DVFP)
- Profession: Military officer

Military service
- Allegiance: German Empire
- Branch/service: Imperial German Army; Luftstreitkräfte
- Years of service: c. 1892–1918
- Rank: Major
- Unit: 65th (5th Rhenish) Infantry Regiment
- Battles/wars: World War I
- Awards: Iron Cross, 1st class

Karl Dincklage (21 September 1874 – 7 October 1930) was a German Nazi Party official and an Oberführer in the Sturmabteilung (SA). He served as the Deputy Gauleiter and Deputy Supreme SA Leader in Hanover.

== Early life ==
Dincklage was born in Wilhelmshaven and, after completing his education, embarked on an officer's career in the Prussian Army, serving as the company commander of the 65th (5th Rhenish) Infantry Regiment, headquartered in Cologne. During the First World War, he was transferred to the Luftstreitkräfte (Air Force), becoming leader of a reserve aviator battalion. He was awarded the Iron Cross, first class, and at the end of the war in 1918, he retired from active military service with the rank of Major. He settled in Hanover and became politically active, serving as the local secretary of the conservative German National People's Party (DNVP). In 1922, he joined the more far right and anti-Semitic German Völkisch Freedom Party (DVFP), co-founding the Hanover branch and being elected as a member of the city assembly.

== Nazi career ==
In early 1925, Dincklage joined the Nazi Party when the ban imposed on it following the Beer Hall Putsch was lifted, serving as the business manager in the Hanover local office. He, together with Gauleiter Bernhard Rust, contributed to the conversion of the entire DVFP Hanoverian provincial organization to the Nazis. In March 1925, Dincklage was appointed Deputy Gauleiter and Gau-SA Führer of the newly formed Gau Hanover-North, and also continued to head the local Hanover office until 1929. Together with Rust, Dincklage in September 1925 became a member of the National Socialist Working Association, a short-lived group of northern and western German Gaue, organized and led by Gregor Strasser, which advocated for non-participation in electoral politics, unsuccessfully sought to amend the Party program and was dissolved in 1926 following the Bamberg Conference.

Once Adolf Hitler made the decision to participate in electoral politics as the road to power, Dincklage, in his role as a Party speaker, became well known throughout the Gau as the "backpack major" because he often traveled from village to village by bicycle to speaking engagements where he would agitate the population to successfully mobilize voters in provincial and Reichstag elections. He would paste up posters in the morning, engage local residents throughout the day and deliver a speech in the village tavern in the evening before moving on to the next village.

Dincklage was also for a time an editor for the local weekly Nazi newspaper named the Niedersächsischer Beobachter (Lower Saxony Observer). In April 1927, a dispute arose in the Hanover Gau criticizing Hitler and advancing Erich Ludendorff as the "greater man." Dincklage showed unswerving loyalty to Hitler, noting that individual feelings had to be subordinated to the overriding need for Party unity. He wrote: "We in Gau Hanover retain our loyal following to Hitler. It's quite immaterial whether we think Hitler or Ludendorff is the greater." He was fully supportive of the Party's renewed emphasis on turning to the middle classes for electoral support. In a December 1927 letter to a Nazi Reichstag deputy, Franz Stöhr, he wrote: "In full agreement ... that we shall not yet succeed in winning much ground from the Marxists in the coming election. We shall receive most sympathy from the small businessman ... further, from the white-collar worker, who ... is already an anti-semite."

On 1 March 1928, Supreme SA Leader Franz Pfeffer von Salomon created seven new regional SA commands, each under an SA-Oberführer. Dincklage was named to one of these as Deputy Supreme SA Leader-North, based in Hanover. On 1 October 1928, Gau Hanover-North absorbed Gau Hanover-South to form Gau Southern Hanover-Brunswick and Dincklage remained in his Deputy Gauleiter position under Rust. He held these positions until his death.

== Death ==
In early 1930, Dincklage fell ill with pneumonia, the result, it was supposed, from bicycling in inclement winter weather. He spent many months in treatment, and died on 7 October 1930. The urn with his ashes was buried in the presence of Adolf Hitler, who spoke at his funeral on 18 October at the Hauptfriedhof Braunschweig (Brunswick Main Cemetery). Dincklage's successor as Deputy Supreme SA Leader-North was Viktor Lutze, who would later become SA-Stabschef, following the Night of the Long Knives. The Nazis honored Dincklage as a "hero of the movement," with SA-Standarte 73 (Hanover) being given the honorary designation "Dincklage." Also, after the Nazis came to power, streets in Hanover and Northeim and a plaza in Hildesheim were renamed in his honor, returning to their former names upon the fall of the Nazi regime in 1945.

== Sources ==
- Böttcher, Dirk; Mlynek, Klaus; Röhrbein, Waldemar R.; Thielen, Hugo, eds. (2002). Hannoversches Biographisches Lexikon: von den Anfängen bis in die Gegenwart. Hanover: Schlütersche. ISBN 3-87706-706-9. Karl Dincklage entry, p. 96
- Campbell, Bruce (1998). The SA Generals and the Rise of Nazism. University Press of Kentucky. ISBN 0-8131-2047-0.
- Kershaw, Ian (2000). Hitler, 1889-1936: Hubris. W. W. Norton & Company. ISBN 978-0-393-32035-0.
- Miller, Michael D.; Schulz, Andreas (2012). Gauleiter: The Regional Leaders of the Nazi Party and Their Deputies, 1925–1945. Vol. 1 (Herbert Albrecht - H. Wilhelm Hüttmann). R. James Bender Publishing. ISBN 978-1-932-97021-0.
- Miller, Michael D.; Schulz, Andreas (2017). Gauleiter: The Regional Leaders of the Nazi Party and Their Deputies, 1925–1945. Vol. 2 (Georg Joel - Dr. Bernhard Rust). R. James Bender Publishing. ISBN 978-1-932-97032-6.
- Mühlberger, Detlef (2004). Hitler's Voice: The Völkischer Beobachter, 1920-1933, Vol. 1: Organisation & Development of the Nazi Party. Peter Lang. ISBN 978-3-906-76972-1.
- Noakes, Jeremy; Pridham, Geoffrey, eds. (1983). Nazism 1919-1945, Volume 1: The Rise to Power 1919-1934 (1998 ed.). University of Exeter Press. ISBN 0-85989 598 X.
- Philipps, Sören (2002). Hildesheimer Gedächtnisorte – eine Lokalstudie zum kollektiven Gedächtnis von der Kaiserzeit bis heute. Weißensee-Verlag. ISBN 978-3-934-47975-3.
- Turner, Henry Ashby Jr., ed. (1985). Hitler – Memoirs of a Confidant. Yale University Press. ISBN 978-0-300-03294-9.
