= Muhs =

Muhs is a surname. Notable people with the surname include:

- Hermann Muhs (1894–1962), German lawyer and Nazi Party politician
- Kenneth Muhs (born 1972), Danish politician
