= Emil Holtz =

Nazi official (1873 – unknown)

Gauleiter, Gau Brandenburg
- In office 1 October 1928 – 30 September 1930
- Preceded by: Position established
- Succeeded by: Ernst Schlange
- Second Deputy Gauleiter, Gau Berlin-Brandenburg
- In office November 1926 – 30 September 1928
- Preceded by: Position established
- Succeeded by: Position abolished

Personal details
- Born: 25 May 1873 Pyritz, Province of Pomerania, Kingdom of Prussia, German Empire
- Died: unknown
- Party: Nazi Party
- Other political affiliations: German Socialist Party
- Profession: Schoolteacher

Emil Holtz (25 May 1873 – unknown) was a German schoolteacher and an early Nazi Party official who served as Gauleiter of Gau Brandenburg from 1928 to 1930. He was charged with and convicted of sexual assault, had to resign his positions and was imprisoned. He never resumed a political role and little is known of his later life.

== Early life ==
The son of a Pomeranian farmer, Holtz was born in Pyritz (today, Pyrzyce, Poland) and was employed as a secondary school teacher. He became active in antisemitic circles before the turn of the twentieth century. After the First World War, he joined the German Socialist Party (DSP) in Berlin in 1920. This was a radically antisemitic, nationalist and Völkisch organization. In November of that year, he became chairman of the DSP. Never a mass party, the DSP in March 1922 merged with the larger Nazi Party (NSDAP) with which it shared a common ideology. During the ban on the Nazis imposed in the aftermath of Adolf Hitler's failed Beer Hall Putsch of November 1923, Holtz remained active as a speaker and propagandist for the national socialist cause in Brandenburg.

== Nazi Party career ==
Following the February 1925 re-establishment of the Party, Holtz joined it on 29 July (membership number 11,751). Considerably older than most of the other leaders, Holtz did not share with them the experience of military service in World War I or participation in the Freikorps. However, in 1926, Holz was made the SA-Führer of the Berlin Sturmabteilung (SA). In November of that year, the newly installed Gauleiter of Gau Berlin-Brandenburg, Joseph Goebbels, appointed him as Second Deputy Gauleiter. From March 1927, Holtz also was the chairman of the Gau USCHLA committee, charged with investigating and adjudicating intra-Party conflicts and disputes. In May 1928, he stood as a candidate for the Landtag of Prussia but was not elected.

Goebbels, meanwhile, had difficulty administering the Gau due to ongoing conflicts with the SA leadership, in particular, Deputy Supreme SA-Führer East Walter Stennes and elements aligned with the more socialist, revolutionary wing of the Party. Consequently, on 1 October 1928, Gau Berlin-Brandenburg was divided into Gau Groß-Berlin and Gau Brandenburg, which comprised most of the Province of Brandenburg. While Goebbels maintained his position in Berlin, Holtz became the new Gauleiter of Brandenburg. As such, he was responsible directly to Hitler and effectively served as his viceroy to the Gau in all Party matters. Holtz would hold this position for nearly two years.

In 1929, Holtz was accused of sexual assault and was suspended from his teaching post. At the end of September 1930, he resigned as Gauleiter, officially for health reasons, and also resigned from the Nazi Party on 30 September 1930. Facing criminal prosecution, he was forced to decline the mandate he had just won in the Reichstag election of 14 September 1930 from electoral constituency Potsdam I. After his trial in March 1931, Holtz was sentenced to six months imprisonment. He never resumed his political career, and no additional details are known about his later life.

== Sources ==
- Höffkes, Karl (1986). Hitlers Politische Generale. Die Gauleiter des Dritten Reiches: ein biographisches Nachschlagewerk. Tübingen: Grabert-Verlag. ISBN 3-87847-163-7.
- Longerich, Peter (2015). Goebbels. Vintage. ISBN 978-0-099-52369-7.
- Miller, Michael D.; Schulz, Andreas (2012). Gauleiter: The Regional Leaders of the Nazi Party and Their Deputies, 1925-1945. Vol. I (Herbert Albrecht - H. Wilhelm Hüttmann). R. James Bender Publishing. ISBN 978-1-932970-21-0.
