= Helmuth Friedrichs =

German Nazi politician

Helmuth Friedrichs (22 September 1899 in Otterndorf – probably February 1945) was a German Nazi Party official. He was an important figure in the Office of the Deputy Führer and its successor the Nazi Party Chancellery.

== Early years ==
After secondary school Friedrichs enlisted in the German Imperial Army in 1916, seeing service in the First World War. Serving on both fronts, he was captured by the British in October 1918 and held as a prisoner of war until the end of 1919. Serving with the Freikorps and the army, he joined with Karl Dincklage, later a Sturmabteilung (SA) leader, in campaigning for the German National People's Party. He also worked as a miner in Westphalia and studied at the Mining Academy in Clausthal-Zellerfeld without graduating. He was nicknamed "Long Friedrichs" on account of his height.

== Nazi Party ==
He joined the Nazi Party in 1929 the SA in turn of the year 1929/1930 and the Schutzstaffel in 1936. He reached the rank of SS-Gruppenführer in 1944. In November 1933, he was elected as a deputy of the Reichstag for electoral constituency 19 (Hessen-Nassau) and retained this seat until the fall of the Nazi regime in May 1945.

=== Party Chancellery ===
Friedrichs was serving as head of organisation in Gau Essen in March 1934 when Rudolf Hess appointed him to his staff as head of the "party division". In this role he served as liaison between Hess and Martin Bormann, meeting the former weekly to obtain his general policy ideas before passing these on to Bormann who then developed specific initiative based upon Hess's initial ideas. Heinrich Walkenhorst served as his deputy, with both men remaining in office until 1945.

Along with Gerhard Klopfer Friedrichs was the highest-ranking bureaucrat behind Bormann in the Chancellery. As a result, he wielded a significant level of influence as the office controlled appointments to various party positions, including those of Gauleiter and Reich minister, and Bormann often delegated appointments to his two deputies. Along with Gottlob Berger he was also appointed as one of the two Chiefs of Staff of the Volkssturm upon the foundation of this civil defence force in 1944.

== Disappearance ==
Friedrichs was reported missing from February 1945; on 13 August 1951 he was declared legally dead by the Munich district court with his date of death officially set as 31 December 1945.

== See also ==
- List of people who disappeared mysteriously: post-1970
