= Dankeskirche =

Dankeskirche (lit. 'Thanksgiving Church' in German) may refer to:

- Dankeskirche, Bad Nauheim, the central Protestant church in Bad Nauheim
- Dankeskirche, Benrath, a Protestant church in Düsseldorf-Benrath
- Dankeskirche, Berlin, a church in the Berlin quarter Wedding
- Dankeskirche, Braunschweig, a church in Braunschweig
- Dankeskirche, Düsseldorf, a church in Düsseldorf
- Dankeskirche, Frankfurt, a church in Frankfurt
- Dankeskirche, Halbe, a church in Halbe, Brandenburg
- Dankeskirche, Hamm, a church in the Hamburg quarter Hamm
- Dankeskirche, Rahlstedt, a church in the Hamburg quarter Rahlstedt
- Dankeskirche, Hürth, a church in Hürth
- Dankeskirche, Holtenau, a church in the Kiel district Holtenau
- Dankeskirche, Munich, a church in Munich
- Dankeskirche, Sebaldsbrück, a former church in the Bremen suburb Sebaldsbrück
- Dankeskirche, Sehlen, a church in Sehlen
- Heimkehrer-Dankeskirche, a Roman Catholic church in the Weitmar district of Bochum

== See also ==
- Votive church (disambiguation)
