= Ernst Schlange =

German Nazi Party official and politician (1888–1947)

Gauleiter of Gross-Berlin
- In office 14 March 1925 – 20 June 1926
- Preceded by: Position established
- Succeeded by: Erich Schmiedicke
- Gauleiter of Gau Brandenburg
- In office 18 October 1930 – 16 March 1933
- Preceded by: Emil Holtz
- Succeeded by: Erich Schmiedicke

Personal details
- Born: Ernst Paul Hans Schlange; 1 September 1888 Gut Schwaneberg, Kingdom of Prussia, German Empire
- Died: 28 February 1947 (aged 58) NKVD special camp Nr. 7, Allied-occupied Germany
- Party: Nazi Party
- Other political affiliations: German National People's Party; German Social Party; National Socialist Freedom Party; Greater German People's Community
- Profession: Lawyer

Military service
- Allegiance: German Empire
- Branch/service: Imperial German Army
- Years of service: 1914–1919
- Rank: Oberleutnant
- Unit: 2nd (Kaiser Franz) Garde-Grenadier Regiment; Guards Fusilier Regiment
- Battles/wars: World War I
- Awards: Iron Cross, 1st class and 2nd class

Ernst Schlange (1 September 1888 – 28 February 1947) was a German Nazi Party official and politician who served as Gauleiter of Gross-Berlin and later of Gau Brandenburg. He was also a lawyer and a member of the Prussian Landtag. Severely wounded in World War I, he became active in various antisemitic, far right political groups and eventually joined the National Socialist German Worker's Party. He was opposed to the Party's more extreme tactics for gaining power and was a close ally of the Strasser brothers. After their fall from power, Schlange lost his leadership posts by the mid-1930s. He died in Soviet captivity after the end of World War II.

== Early life ==
Born in Gut Schwaneberg near Prenzlau in the Prussian Province of Brandenburg, Schlange was the eldest son of an estate owner. After attending volksschule and gymnasium, he studied law and political science at the University of Halle and the Greifswald from 1907 to 1912. In 1913, he was employed as a clerk at the Darmstädter und Nationalbank in Berlin. He earned his Doctor of Law degree and passed the Great State Legal Examination (German: Große Juristische Staatsprüfung) in Prenzlau in 1914.

At the start of World War I, Schlange, due to an earlier injury to his left hand in a hunting accident, was exempted from conscription. However, he volunteered for the German Army and was deployed to the Western Front with the 2nd (Kaiser Franz) Garde-Grenadier Regiment in 1914 with the rank of Gefreiter. Promoted to Leutnant, he was transferred to the Eastern Front in April 1915 with the Guards Fusilier Regiment. He served as a platoon leader and a company commander until being severely wounded on 1 June 1915 at Stepj in Galicia, losing his right arm and right lung. He was awarded the Iron Cross, 1st and 2nd class. He spent the rest of the war recuperating in hospitals and was discharged as a Reserve Oberleutnant in May 1919. He married in 1917.

In 1919 Schlange joined the German National People's Party, an alliance of nationalists, reactionary monarchists, völkisch and antisemitic elements. However, in June 1922, he joined the Deutschsoziale Partei (DtSP) founded by Richard Kunze, another völkisch, antisemitic political group and early rival to the Nazi Party. Schlange established local chapters (Ortsgruppen) in Wilmersdorf, Zehlendorf and Steglitz. Then in October 1922, Schlange joined the Nazi Party. In November 1923, the Party was banned in the wake of the Beer Hall Putsch and Schlange joined the National Socialist Freedom Movement, a Nazi front organization. In May 1924 he joined the ephemeral Großdeutsche Volksgemeinschaft (Greater German People's Community) another Nazi front organization. He served as its Gauführer in Berlin but left in favor of rejoining the Nazi Party on 27 February 1925 when it regained legal status (membership number 4,837).

== Nazi career ==
Adolf Hitler authorized Gregor Strasser to act on his behalf in organizing the Party in northern Germany. On 14 March 1925, Strasser selected Schlange as Party Gauleiter in Gau Gross-Berlin and Hitler ratified the choice on 27 March. On 10 September 1925, Schlange joined the National Socialist Working Association, a group of northern and northwestern Gauleiters aligned with the left wing of the Party and headed by Strasser. A close confidant of Strasser and his brother Otto Strasser, Schlange was also part-owner of the Strassers’ publishing business, Kampf-Verlag.

Schlange’s tenure as Gauleiter in Berlin was marked by disputes over the course of the Party. He spoke out against the violent methods of the Sturmabteilung (SA) in Berlin but could not prevail. He wanted a more cautious course for the Party and the pursuit of power by legal means. Criticized for his weak leadership style within his own wing of the party, Schlange was placed on leave on 28 February 1926 and resigned from his post on 20 June. Schlange was succeeded by his Deputy Gauleiter, Erich Schmiedicke, but the conflicts remained unresolved, and in October he, in turn, was replaced by Joseph Goebbels as the head of a new, enlarged Gau Berlin-Brandenburg.

Schlange moved to Potsdam, where he took over the building of the Nazi Party there. On 1 August 1929, he became a Government Councilor (Regierungsrat) in the Reich Finance Administration. In November 1929, he became a Potsdam City Councilor and leader of the Nazi faction in that body. On 18 October 1930, Schlange was reappointed Gauleiter, this time of Gau Brandenburg (which again had been separated from Berlin in October 1928) succeeding Emil Holtz. On 24 April 1932, he was democratically elected to the Prussian Landtag, serving until it was dissolved on 14 October 1933.

Schlange’s patron, Gregor Strasser, resigned from the leadership cadre of the Party on 8 December 1932 after a serious disagreement with Hitler over strategy for achieving power. Shortly after the Nazi seizure of power, Schlange too was forced out of office on 16 March 1933, and his Deputy, Schmiedicke, served only briefly as acting Gauleiter until 1 June when the Gau was merged with neighboring Gau Ostmark to form the new Gau Kurmark. Leadership of the new Gau went to Wilhelm Kube, the incumbent Gauleiter of Ostmark. Schlange lost political influence and held only minor posts after that: in 1934 he was elected President-General of the Prussian-South German Lottery, appointed President of the State Gazette in 1935, and Chairman of the Kösener Senioren-Convents-Verband (KSCV) in 1936. On 10 March 1937, Hitler refused Schlange the right to wear his former Gauleiter service uniform. Further details of his life remain unknown.

== Death ==
When the Third Reich collapsed in 1945, Schlange was allegedly seen in a Soviet internment camp in the Spreewald. Another source indicates that he was killed on 28 February 1947 at NKVD special camp Nr. 7, a prison set up by the Russians to hold political detainees on the site of the previous Nazi Sachsenhausen concentration camp. According to the KSCV Corps listings and his award of the Iron Cross, Schlange died in 1947.
