= Erich Schmiedicke =

German Nazi Party official and politician (1887 – 1970)

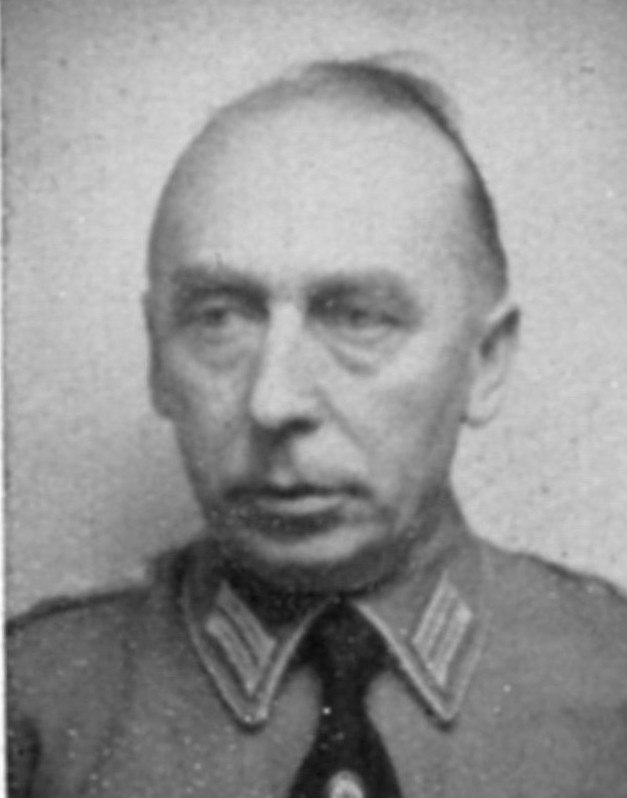
- Schmiedicke, c. 1933

Deputy Gauleiter Gau Gross-Berlin
- (Acting Gauleiter from 28 February 1926)
- In office February 1925 – 28 October 1926
- Preceded by: Ernst Schlange
- Succeeded by: Position abolished

Deputy Gauleiter Gau Brandenburg
- (Acting Gauleiter from 16 March 1933)
- In office 1932 – 1 June 1933
- Preceded by: Position created
- Succeeded by: Position abolished

Oberburgermeister of Guben
- In office July 1933 – February 1945
- Preceded by: Heinrich Lass

Personal details
- Born: Erich Karl Traugott Schmiedicke; 13 May 1887 Neustettin, Province of Pomerania, Kingdom of Prussia, German Empire
- Died: 9 February 1970 (aged 82) Heidelberg, West Germany
- Party: National Socialist German Workers' Party (NSDAP)
- Occupation: Salesman

Military service
- Allegiance: German Empire
- Branch/service: Imperial German Navy
- Years of service: 1912-1913; 1914–1918
- Rank: Oberleutnant zur See
- Unit: SMS Goeben; SMS Breslau
- Battles/wars: World War I
- Awards: Iron Cross, 1st and 2nd class

Erich Karl Traugott Schmiedicke (13 May 1887 – 9 February 1970) was a German Nazi Party official and politician.

== Early life ==
Schmiedicke was born the son of a fire chief in Neustettin (today, Szczecinek). After attending volksschule and gymnasium, Schmiedicke trained on German and English sailing ships for a career as a ship’s officer in the merchant marine. From 1910 to 1912 he served as an officer in the Australian merchant navy and also attended the Nautical Academy in Sydney. After his return to Germany, Schmiedicke joined the Imperial German Navy as a one-year volunteer from 1912 to 1913. He attended helmsman’s school in Hamburg, passed the German helmsman's examination in March 1914 and joined the German merchant navy until the outbreak of the First World War.

From August 2, 1914 until the end of the war in 1918, Schmiedicke again served in the Imperial Navy as a Leutnant zur See and Oberleutnant zur See. From 1914 to March 1917 he was posted to the Mediterranean Division aboard the battlecruiser SMS Goeben and the light cruiser SMS Breslau. From April 1917 to August 1918 he served in a staff position in the high command of the German naval forces in Turkey. In the last months of the war, he was the Naval Liaison Officer to the Bulgarian fleet in Varna. In 1919 and 1920, Schmiedicke was a member of the Freikorps. Returning to civilian life, he was employed as a freelance salesman in Berlin from 1919 to 1930.

== Nazi career ==
In August 1922, Schmiedicke joined the Nazi Party (NSDAP) and its paramilitary branch, the Sturmabteilung (SA). He was a co-founder of the first Ortsgruppe (Local Group) in Berlin and organized the first SA branch in the capital as well. He headed the SA Berlin branch until the ban on the Party and the SA in the wake of the failed Beer Hall Putsch in November 1923. When the ban was lifted, Schmiedicke reenrolled on 11 May 1925 (membership number 4,366) and was named Deputy Gauleiter for Gau Gross-Berlin under Gauleiter Ernst Schlange.

The Gau organization in Berlin in early 1926 has been described as being “in a state of disarray bordering on chaos,” with the Gauleiter completely unable to quell the internal feuds that were plaguing the organization. Consequently, on 28 February 1926, Schlange was placed on leave due to his inability to heal the divisions within the local Party and Schmiedicke was left in charge as Acting Gauleiter. Schlange officially resigned on 20 June 1926 and Schmiedicke continued to lead the Gau; however, he was also unable to bring unity to the squabbling factions. Adolf Hitler determined that an outside leader was needed to restore order and offered the position to Joseph Goebbels. Schmiedicke himself wrote to Goebbels on 16 October urging him to take the post. Gau Gross-Berlin was merged with Gau Potsdam to form the expanded new Gau Berlin-Brandenburg on 28 October and Goebbels became Gauleiter. Goebbels gave the post of Deputy Gauleiter to Kurt Daluege, and Schmiedicke was temporarily out of a job.

In 1931 Schmiedicke was appointed as Business Manager for Gau Brandenburg (which again had been separated from Gau Berlin in 1928) and the next year he also became its Deputy Gauleiter, again under Ernst Schlange. At the 5 March 1933 Reichstag election, Schmiedicke was elected as a deputy for electoral constituency 4 (Potsdam I) but only served until the November election. When Gauleiter Schlange resigned on 16 March 1933, Schmiedicke again was elevated to Acting Gauleiter. His time in charge was even shorter than in Berlin, however, because Gau Brandenburg was merged with the neighboring Gau Ostmark to form Gau Kurmark and on 1 June was placed under the leadership of Wilhelm Kube, the incumbent Ostmark Gauleiter.

In July 1933, Schmiedicke was named Acting Oberburgermeister (Mayor) of the city of Guben in eastern Brandenburg, as well as police administrator for the city. Additionally, on 15 August 1933, he was made Nazi Party Kreisleiter (County Leader) for the Guben region. On 19 October he was elected for a twelve year term as the Guben Oberburgermeister. On 29 July 1934, Gauleiter Kube bestowed upon Schmiedicke the title of Honorary Deputy Gauleiter. In July 1935, he was named Prussian Provincial Councilor (Provinzialrat) for the Provinces of Brandenburg and Posen-West Prussia. In March 1937, he was specifically authorized by Hitler to wear the uniform and insignia of a former Deputy Gauleiter.

Schmiedicke rejoined the SA on 9 November 1938 with the rank of SA-Standartenführer, and was placed in charge of Standarte 451 (Guben). In the autumn of 1944, he led a Volkssturm battalion in Guben. He most likely fled from the city when it was evacuated in February 1945 ahead of the Red Army advance. The details of his death are not known.

== Sources ==
- Friedrich, Thomas (2012). Hitler's Berlin: Abused City. Yale University Press. ISBN 978-0-300-16670-5.
- Miller, Michael D.; Schulz, Andreas (2017). Gauleiter: The Regional Leaders of the Nazi Party and Their Deputies, 1925-1945. Vol. 2 (Georg Joel - Dr. Bernhard Rust). R. James Bender Publishing. ISBN 978-1-932970-32-6.
- Miller, Michael D.; Schulz, Andreas (2021). Gauleiter: The Regional Leaders of the Nazi Party and Their Deputies. Vol. 3. Fonthill Media. ISBN 978-1-781-55826-3.
- Orlow, Dietrich (1969). The History of the Nazi Party: 1919-1933. University of Pittsburgh Press. ISBN 0-8229-3183-4.
- Williams, Max (2015). SS Elite: The Senior Leaders of Hitler's Praetorian Guard. Vol. I. Fonthill Media LLC. ISBN 978-1-78155-433-3.

== External website ==
- Information about Erich Schmiedicke in the Reichstag database
