= Ludolf Haase =

Nazi Party official (1898–1972)

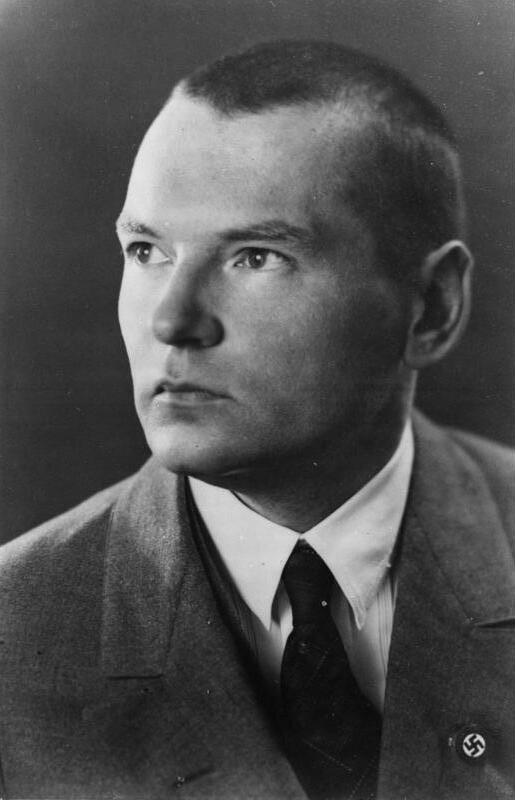
- Haase in 1926

Gauleiter of Gau Göttingen later, Gau Hanover-South
- In office 27 March 1925 – 20 July 1928
- Appointed by: Adolf Hitler
- Preceded by: Position created
- Succeeded by: Bernhard Rust

Personal details
- Born: 6 January 1898 Hanover, Province of Hanover, Kingdom of Prussia, German Empire
- Died: 8 October 1972 (aged 74) Ilten, Lower Saxony, West Germany
- Party: Nazi Party
- Education: University of Göttingen
- Profession: Physician
- Awards: Golden Party Badge

Ludolf Haase (6 January 1898 – 8 October 1972) was a German physician and an early Nazi Party official who served as the Gauleiter in southern Hanover from 1925 to 1928. Injured in a street brawl, he resigned his post in July 1928. During the latter part of the Second World War, he worked in the Reich Ministry of Food and Agriculture. Following the end of the war, he underwent denazification proceedings, was not jailed or sanctioned and practiced medicine in the Hanover area.

== Early life ==
Haase was born in Hanover and, after attending Volksschule and Gymnasium, studied medicine at the University of Göttingen and became a practicing physician. In Göttingen in 1921, he served as the local chairman of the Deutschvölkischer Schutz- und Trutzbund, the largest, most active, and most influential antisemitic federation in Germany. In February 1922, he joined the Nazi Party and founded the first Ortsgruppe (local group) in Göttingen, becoming the Ortsgruppenleiter.

Following the Beer Hall Putsch, the Nazi Party was outlawed and Adolf Hitler was incarcerated in Landsberg Prison. Haase remained personally devoted to Hitler and, while the Party was outlawed, Haase carried on activities as Bezirksleiter (district leader) of the Hanover National Socialist Landesverband (state association), a Nazi front organization.

In addition, Haase became one of the leaders, and the most active force, of the North German Directory (later renamed the National Socialist Working Community, or NSAG) working under Adalbert Volck. This was a Nazi faction in northern Germany, formed on 3 June 1924 in Hamburg, that was opposed to another front organization, the National Socialist Freedom Party, and its attempt to merge with the remaining elements of the Nazi Party. In particular, the Directory was opposed to the NSFP's advocacy of participation in parliamentary elections, which they viewed as incompatible with the revolutionary impetus of National Socialism.

Haase, intent on getting Hitler's backing for the Directory's anti-unification position, wrote to him on 14 June 1924 through a friend, Hermann Fobke, a member of the Stoßtrupp-Hitler, who was jailed along with Hitler in Landsberg and was acting as his correspondence secretary. Haase pressed Hitler for a commitment not to sanction a merger of the Nazi Party elements with the NSFP. On 16 June, Hitler responded by refusing to intervene in the factional dispute or to allow his name to be used in support of any political position. He essentially withdrew from the leadership of the Party until such time as he was released from prison and regained his freedom of action.

== Nazi career ==
After Hitler was released from prison on 20 December 1924 and announced his intention to re-establish the Nazi Party, Volck resigned as the NSAG leader on 12 January 1925 and Haase took charge on 21 January. When the ban on the Party was lifted and it was refounded on 27 February, Haase disbanded the NSAG and urged all his followers to join the new Party. Haase himself rejoined it on 6 March 1925 (membership number 2,827). As an early Party member, he would later be awarded the Golden Party Badge. On 27 March 1925, Haase was appointed the Gauleiter for Gau Göttingen. This was composed of the southern section of the Province of Hanover known as Regierungsbezirk (Governmental District) Hildesheim. Fobke was named Deputy Gauleiter. In December, the organization was redesignated Gau Hanover-South.

In September 1925, Haase's Gau joined the National Socialist Working Association, a short-lived group of northern and western German Gaue, organized and led by Gregor Strasser. Haase and Fobke, both still strong advocates of non-participation in electoral politics, viewed this organization as a means to build additional support for their position, and they were able to obtain the group's consensus to advance a resolution to Hitler that pushed strongly for electoral abstention. On Strasser's initiative, a new draft program was drawn up to replace the Party program of 1920. However, both Haase and Fobke had reservations about the draft, finding it lacked sufficient völkisch content. Subsequently, Hitler completely repudiated the proposed draft at the Bamberg Conference, a meeting that neither Fobke nor Haase attended, and the Working Association was dissolved shortly thereafter.

Under Haase's leadership, according to the historian Hans-Jürgen Döscher, "the Hanover and Göttingen local groups developed into the most active and largest bases of the National Socialists in Lower Saxony". Haase suffered a head injury in an altercation with political opponents in 1927, and he resigned as Gauleiter on 20 July 1928. Gau Hanover-South was merged with neighboring Gau Hanover-North under Bernhard Rust on 1 October, and was renamed Gau Southern Hanover-Brunswick.

During the Night of the Long Knives on 30 June 1934, Haase was arrested and held for about three weeks before being released. However, in February 1943, he secured a position as a personal assistant to Herbert Backe, the State Secretary in the Reich Ministry of Food and Agriculture and an SS-Obergruppenführer.

After World War II, Haase resumed the practice of medicine in Wunstorf in the Hanover area. In April 1949, the denazification committee of the city of Hanover classified him as Category IV (follower) and he was not jailed or sanctioned. He died in Ilten, a village of the township of Sehnde in 1972.

== Sources ==
- Döscher, Hans-Jürgen (2008). "Kampf gegen das Judenthum". Gustav Stille 1845–1920. Antisemit im Deutschen Kaiserreich (in German). Berlin: Metropol. ISBN 978-3-938690-90-1.
- Höffkes, Karl (1986). Hitlers Politische Generale. Die Gauleiter des Dritten Reiches: ein biographisches Nachschlagewerk (in German). Tübingen: Grabert-Verlag. ISBN 3-87847-163-7.
- Jablonsky, David (1989). The Nazi Party in Dissolution. Frank Cass and Company, Ltd. ISBN 0-71463-322-4.
- Kershaw, Ian (2008). Hitler: A Biography. W.W. Norton & Co. ISBN 978-0-393-33761-7.
- Miller, Michael D.; Schulz, Andreas (2012). 'Gauleiter: The Regional Leaders of the Nazi Party and Their Deputies, 1925-1945. Vol. I (Herbert Albrecht - H. Wilhelm Hüttmann). R. James Bender Publishing. ISBN 978-1-932970-21-0.
- Miller, Michael D.; Schulz, Andreas (2017). 'Gauleiter: The Regional Leaders of the Nazi Party and Their Deputies, 1925-1945. Vol. II (Georg Joel - Dr. Bernhard Rust). R. James Bender Publishing. ISBN 978-1-932970-32-6.
- Noakes, Jeremy (October 1966). "Conflict and Development in the NSDAP 1924-1927". Journal of Contemporary History. 1 (4). Sage Publications, Ltd.: 19–35. doi:10.1177/002200946600100401. S2CID 154357701.
- Noakes, Jeremy; Pridham, Geoffrey, eds. (1998) [1983]. Nazism 1919-1945, Volume 1: The Rise to Power 1919-1934 (1998 ed.). University of Exeter Press. ISBN 0-85989 598 X.
- Stachura, Peter D. (2015). Gregor Strasser and the Rise of Nazism. London: Routledge. ISBN 978-1-138-79862-5.
