= Adalbert Volck (Nazi Party official) =

Early Nazi Party official

Director, North German Directory (later, National Socialist Working Community)
- In office 3 June 1924 – 12 January 1925
- Preceded by: Position established
- Succeeded by: Ludolf Haase

Personal details
- Born: 27 June 1868 Dorpat, Governorate of Livonia, Russian Empire
- Died: 1948 (aged 79–80) Lüneburg, Allied-occupied Germany
- Party: Nazi Party
- Other political affiliations: German Völkisch Freedom Party
- Occupation: Lawyer

Adalbert Volck (27 June 1868 – 1948) was a lawyer of Baltic German extraction who headed one of the many front organizations that existed during the period following the failed Beer Hall Putsch, when the Nazi Party was officially outlawed and Adolf Hitler was incarcerated in Landsberg Prison. Volck, based in northern Germany, founded the North German Directory at Hamburg in June 1924 and renamed it the National Socialist Working Community (NSAG) in September. However, shortly after Hitler's release from prison, Volck resigned the NSAG leadership. After Hitler reestablished the Nazi Party at Munich in February 1925, NSAG disbanded. Volck never received any position in the Party hierarchy and little is documented of his subsequent life.

== Early life ==
Volck was born in Dorpat (today, Tartu, Estonia) in what was then the Russian Empire. He was the son of Wilhelm Volck, a professor of theology, and the nephew of Adalbert J. Volck, a dentist and caricaturist. Not much is known of his early years other than he became a lawyer. During the First World War, he emigrated via Japan and the United States and, in 1919, settled in Lüneburg in the Weimar Republic. He worked there as a lawyer and a bank official. A proponent of the Völkisch movement, he met Adolf Hitler and Dietrich Eckart at a Party rally in Coburg in October 1922. In December 1922, Volck helped found the nationalist and antisemitic German Völkisch Freedom Party (DVFP) in Berlin. By the spring of 1924, however, he was expelled from the DVFP over differences with other party leaders Albrecht von Graefe, Reinhold Wulle and Wilhelm Henning. From that point on, he became a staunch supporter of Hitler and the Nazi Party.

== North German Directory ==
With Hitler in prison and the Party outlawed, the Nazi movement was in disarray and several front organizations arose to fill the void. In Bavaria in southern Germany, this took the form of the Greater German People's Community (GVG), organized in January 1924. This was headquartered in Munich and first headed by Alfred Rosenberg and then by Hermann Esser and Julius Streicher. In northern Germany, a rival organization, the National Socialist Freedom Party (NSFP), was organized in April 1924 by von Graefe and Erich Ludendorff from some former adherents of the outlawed Nazi Party and the DVFP, which remained the dominant influence.

Volck, though based in northern Germany, strenuously disagreed with one of the central elements of the NSFP platform, namely, participation in parliamentary elections at the state (Landtag) and national (Reichstag) levels. He still clung to the original revolutionary orientation of the Nazi Party and viewed the NSFP as just another bourgeois party associated with the hated Weimar Republic. Refusing to join the NSFP, Volck assembled a coalition of like-minded individuals on 3 June 1924 in Hamburg and established an Arbeitsgemeinschaft (working group) headed by a three-person directorate. For this reason it was referred to as the North German Directory. His two deputies in the triumvirate were Ludolf Haase of Göttingen and Reinhard Sunkel of Griefswald. Volck immediately issued instructions establishing a very tight chain of command flowing from the Directory to state, provincial, regional and local Party organizations. However, citing previous business commitments, on 6 June he turned over the day-to-day running of the Directory to Haase for two months.

A nationwide conference for Nazi Party leaders had been scheduled for 20 July at Weimar. On the agenda was formulation of the Party's position on Ludendorff's anticipated plan for a unification of all Nazi elements throughout Germany with the NSFP. Haase, intent on getting Hitler's backing for the Directory's anti-unification position, wrote to him on 14 June 1924 through a friend, Hermann Fobke, who was jailed along with Hitler in Landsberg and was acting as his correspondence secretary. Haase pressed Hitler for a commitment not to sanction a merger of the Nazi Party elements with the NSFP. On 16 June, Hitler responded by refusing to intervene in the factional dispute or to allow his name to be used in support of any political position. He essentially withdrew from the leadership of the Party until such time as he was released from prison and regained his freedom of action.

In preparation for the upcoming conference, Volck, now back at the head of the Directory, issued directives in mid-July reiterating his opposition to any merger or acceptance of electoral participation. He categorically refused to accept any decision to merge the programs of the two parties, stating that on "fundamental questions of conscience, we bow to no majority decision" and that, should such a resolution be passed, he would expect his followers to bolt the meeting. He summarized his philosophy by declaring: "Our program is summarized in two words: 'Adolf Hitler'."

At the conference on 20 July, Volck led the opposition to the merger, forcefully countering Ludendorff's presentation. He said he was acting as a "placeholder" for Hitler while he was incarcerated and unable to exercise direct leadership of the Nazi movement. Claiming to represent the only ideologically pure conception of National Socialism, he stated: "The highest goal of our movement is not subordination under party and faction." In the end, the Weimar conference adjourned with no decision taken on a merger.

Ludendorff was undeterred and, as expected, called for a joint conference of Nazi and NSFP leaders on 15–17 August 1924, also to be held in Weimar, to approve a merger between the two organizations. None of the leaders of the Directory attended and a resolution was passed joining the NSFP and the Nazi Party into an electoral coalition, newly named the National Socialist Freedom Movement (NSFB). Though not a formal merger, and though differences of opinion and clashes of personality between the NSFP leaders and the Nazi leadership in Munich ensured that true unity remained illusory, this was still too much for Volck and the Directory to accept.

== National Socialist Working Community ==
Calling a meeting of the Directory membership in Harburg on 7 September, Volck moved further away from the Munich leadership of the Nazi Party by forming the National Socialist Working Community (NSAG). Under this new title, the meeting unanimously reaffirmed its opposition to the NSFB, and Volck also obtained passage of a resolution to reject all parliamentary electoral participation. The Nazi movement was more fractured than ever.

Hitler was released from Landsberg Prison on 20 December 1924 and began to make plans for reestablishing a united Party. Volck, after all his efforts on Hitler's behalf, felt that he had established a viable National Socialist structure in northern Germany and that Hitler should make that region the focal point of his reorganization. Although Hitler promised to make a trip to the north, the trip never materialized. Hitler continued to ignore northern Germany and never wavered from his intention to retain the Party's center of operations in Bavaria. Disappointed by these developments, Volck resigned as leader of NSAG on 12 January 1925 and the leadership passed to Haase on 21 January.

Hitler formally re-founded the Nazi Party at the Bürgerbräukeller in Munich on 27 February and most of the high level positions were retained by individuals that had been active in the Munich leadership, including Esser, Phillip Bouhler, Max Amann and Franz Xaver Schwarz. Most former Nazis flocked back to the Party, and both the GVG and the NSFB passed out of existence. Likewise, Haase dissolved the NSAG on 28 February and instructed all members to join the refounded Nazi Party. On 27 March 1925, Haase was confirmed as the Nazi Party Gauleiter of Götttingen.

Volck, still disillusioned with Hitler, never received any position in the Party hierarchy. Little is known of his subsequent life and he died in Lüneburg in 1948.

== Written works ==
- Völkisches Erleben und Wollen (National Experience and Will), 1924
- Die Tragödie des russischen Volkes und die Schuldlüge (The Tragedy of the Russian People and the Lie of Guilt), 1926
- Verklingende Zeiten? (Fading Times?), 1930
- Die Romkirche, ihre Unfehlbarkeitslehre und deren Folgen (The Roman Church, its Doctrine of Infallibility and its Consequences), 1932

== Sources ==
- Jablonsky, David (1989). The Nazi Party in Dissolution. Frank Cass and Company, Ltd. ISBN 0-71463-322-4.
- Kershaw, Ian (2008). Hitler: A Biography. W.W. Norton & Co. ISBN 978-0-393-33761-7.
- Miller, Michael D.; Schulz, Andreas (2012). Gauleiter: The Regional Leaders of the Nazi Party and Their Deputies, 1925–1945. Vol. 1 (Herbert Albrecht – H. Wilhelm Hüttmann). R. James Bender Publishing. ISBN 978-1-932-97021-0.
- Noakes, Jeremy (October 1966). "Conflict and Development in the NSDAP 1924-–1927". Journal of Contemporary History. 1 (4). Sage Publications, Ltd.: 19–35.
- Orlow, Dietrich (1969). The History of the Nazi Party: 1919–1933. University of Pittsburgh Press. ISBN 0-8229-3183-4.
