= Schmölln (disambiguation) =

Schmölln is a town in Thuringia, Germany Schmölln may also refer to:

- Schmölln (Hummelshain), a settlement (Ortsteil) of the municipality Hummelshain in the Saale Orla-Kreis in Thuringia
- Schmölln (Randowtal), an Ortsteil of the municipality Randowtal in the district Uckermark in Brandenburg
- Schmölln (Oberlausitz), an Ortsteil of the municipality Schmölln-Putzkau in the district of Bautzen in Saxony
