= Hanns Kerrl =

Nazi Reichsminister of Church Affairs (1887–1941)

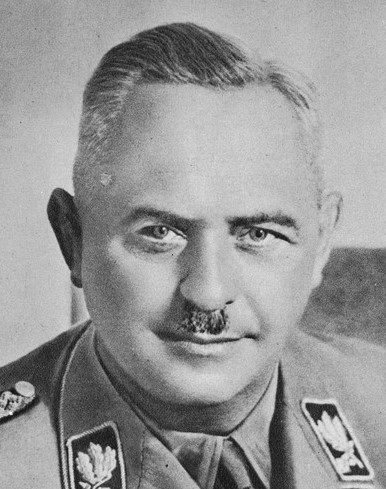
- Kerrl in 1938

Reichsminister of Church Affairs
- In office 16 July 1935 – 14 December 1941
- Leader: Adolf Hitler
- Preceded by: Office established
- Succeeded by: Hermann Muhs

Reichsminister without Portfolio
- In office 17 June 1934 – 16 July 1935

Chief of the Reich Office for Spatial planning
- In office June 1935 – 14 December 1941
- Preceded by: Office established
- Succeeded by: Hermann Muhs

Prussian Minister of Justice
- In office 23 March 1932 – 17 June 1934
- Preceded by: Heinrich Hölscher
- Succeeded by: Franz Gürtner

First Deputy President of the Reichstag
- In office 12 December 1933 – 14 December 1941
- Preceded by: Thomas Esser
- Succeeded by: Office abolished

President of the Landtag of Prussia
- In office 24 May 1932 – 14 October 1933
- Vice President: Wolfgang von Kries; Josef Baum Hoff; Heinrich Haake
- Preceded by: Ernst Wittmaack
- Succeeded by: Office abolished

Personal details
- Born: 11 December 1887 Fallersleben, Kingdom of Prussia, German Empire
- Died: 14 December 1941 (aged 54) Berlin, Nazi Germany
- Resting place: Waldfriedhof Dahlem
- Party: Nazi Party
- Cabinet: Hitler Cabinet

Military service
- Allegiance: German Empire
- Branch/service: Imperial German Army
- Rank: Leutnant
- Battles/wars: World War I
- Awards: Iron Cross, 1st and 2nd class

Hanns Kerrl (11 December 1887 – 14 December 1941) was a German Nazi politician. His most prominent position, from July 1935, was that of Reichsminister of Church Affairs. He was also President of the Prussian Landtag (1932–1933) and head of the Zweckverband Reichsparteitag Nürnberg and in that capacity edited a number of Nuremberg rally yearbooks.

== Early life ==
Kerrl was born into a Protestant family in Fallersleben; his father was a headmaster. He served in the German Army in the First World War as a Leutnant earning the Iron Cross 1st and 2nd Class. He joined the Nazi Party (NSDAP) in 1923 and soon afterwards went into regional politics. A member of the Sturmabteilung, Kerrl would ultimately hold the rank of SA-Obergruppenführer.

== Early Nazi career ==
Joining the Nazi Party in 1923, Kerrl founded and led an Ortsgruppe ('Local Group') in Peine, a town 40 kilometres (25 mi) from Hanover. In late 1925, Kerrl became a member of the National Socialist Working Association, a short-lived group of north and northwest German Gaue, organized and led by Gregor Strasser, which unsuccessfully sought to amend the Party program. It was dissolved in 1926 following the Bamberg Conference. An associate of Bernhard Rust, the local Gauleiter, in 1928 Kerrl became the Kreisleiter of Peine District. Also elected to the Landtag of Prussia in 1928, he served as head of the Nazi faction and, on 24 May 1932 after the Nazis won the largest number of seats in the April election, he became President of the assembly. He remained in this position until the Landtag was finally dissolved on 14 October 1933, in the wake of the Nazi subordination of the German States to the Reich government.

After the Nazi seizure of power, Kerrl was appointed Reich Commissioner to the Prussian Ministry of Justice on 23 March 1933 and on 21 April was made Minister of Justice, serving until June 1934; in this position, Kerrl placed a ban on Jewish notaries preparing official documents and banned Jewish lawyers from practicing in Prussia. In September 1933, he was made a member of the Prussian State Council. He also was named to the Academy for German Law and sat on its präsidium ('standing committee'). Kerrl was elected to the Reichstag for electoral constituency 16, South Hanover-Braunschweig, in November 1933. When the Reichstag convened on 12 December, he was named First Deputy President to Reichstag President Hermann Göring and would serve in this capacity until his death. On 17 June 1934, Kerrl entered the national Reich cabinet as a Reichsminister without Portfolio.

== Minister of Ecclesiastical Affairs ==
In the following year, on 16 July 1935, he was appointed Reichsminister of the newly created Reich Ministry for Church Affairs. On the one hand, Kerrl was supposed to mediate between those Nazi leaders who hated Christianity (for example Heinrich Himmler) and the churches themselves and stress the religious aspect of the Nazi ideology. On the other hand, in tune with the policy of Gleichschaltung, it was Kerrl's job to subjugate the churches – subordinating the various denominations and their leaders to goals decided by the Führer, Adolf Hitler. Indeed, Kerrl had been appointed after Ludwig Müller had been unsuccessful in getting the Protestants to unite in one "Reich Church".

In a speech before several compliant church leaders on 13 February 1937, Kerrl revealed the regime's growing hostility to the church when he declared: "Positive Christianity is National Socialism ... True Christianity is represented by the party ... the Führer is the herald of a new revelation." Kerrl regarded Hitler as replacing Jesus as far as the Nazis were concerned. He also pressured most of the Protestant pastors to swear an oath of loyalty to Hitler.

Gregory Munro (Australian Catholic University, Brisbane) states that:

Kerrl was the only Minister with an explicit commitment to reach a synthesis between Nazism and Christianity. Much to the ire of leading Nazis, Kerrl maintained that Christianity provided an essential foundation for Nazi ideology and that the two forces had to be reconciled. In the short term, at least, it appears that Hitler hoped to recover the initiative in the Church Struggle by returning to the official NSDAP policy of neutrality. The available documents suggest that Hitler temporized between two approaches to the question of the Churches. On the one hand, the predominant radical elements in the Party wanted to reduce clerical influence in German society as quickly as possible – and by force if necessary. On the other hand, Hitler clearly had much to gain from any possible peaceful settlement whereby the Churches would give at least implicit recognition to the supremacy of Nazi ideology in the public realm and restrict themselves solely to their internal affairs. In 1935 Kerrl scored some initial successes in reconciling the differing parties in the Church Struggle. However, by the second half of 1936, his position was clearly undermined by NSDAP hostility, and by the refusal of the churches to work with a government body which they regarded as a captive or stooge of the Nazi Party. Hitler gradually adopted a more uncompromising and intolerant stance, probably under the growing influence of ideologues such as Bormann, Rosenberg and Himmler, who were loath to entertain any idea of the new Germany having a Christian foundation even in a token form.

Kerrl died in office on 14 December 1941, aged 54. He was succeeded by Hermann Muhs.

== Aryanization of the Lindemann house ==
From 1935 to 1941 Kerrl lived at Rupenhorn 5 at Stößensee in Berlin in a house that had been Aryanized, that is forcibly sold, from its Jewish owner, Paul Lindemann. The Lindemann Haus, built in 1928/29 by architect Bruno Paul, was acquired in 1935 by Kerrl when Lindemann was forced to sell by the Nazis.

== Personality ==
The American diplomat, William Russell wrote in his memoir (Berlin Embassy) that Kerrl frequented "Berlin dives" and bars "until the wee hours of the morning".
