= Hermann Fobke =

German Nazi Party official (1899–1943)

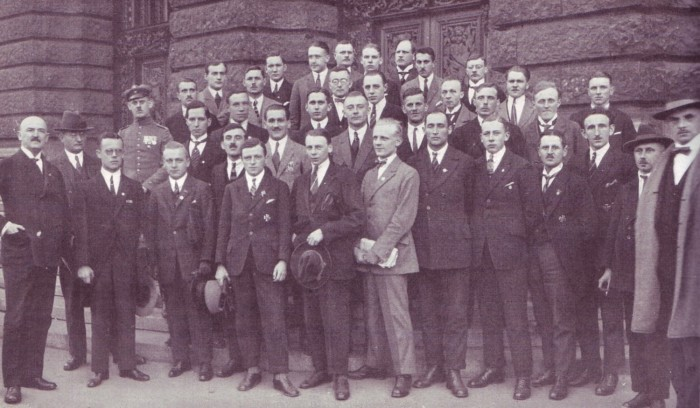
- Fobke (first row, third from left) at his trial in April 1924

Deputy Gauleiter of Gau Göttingen (from December 1925, Gau Hanover-South)
- In office 27 March 1925 – 1 October 1928
- Preceded by: Position established
- Succeeded by: Position abolished

Personal details
- Born: 4 November 1899 Greifswald, Province of Pomerania, Kingdom of Prussia, German Empire
- Died: 19 April 1943 (aged 43) Kerch, Soviet Union
- Party: Nazi Party (NSDAP)
- Education: University of Göttingen

Military service
- Allegiance: German Empire; Nazi Germany
- Branch/service: Imperial German Army; German Army
- Years of service: 1917–1918; 1942–1943
- Rank: Sonderführer
- Battles/wars: World War I World War II

Hermann Franz Arthur Fobke (4 November 1899 – 19 April 1943) was a Nazi Party official and an officer in the SA. Following the Beer Hall Putsch, he was imprisoned with Adolf Hitler in Landsberg Prison and served as his secretary. From 1925 to 1928, he was the Deputy Gauleiter of Gau Hanover-South. He died on the eastern front during the Second World War.

== Early life ==
Fobke was born in Greifswald in the Prussian Province of Pomerania. After attending Volksschule and Gymnasium in Stettin (today, Szczecin), Fobke enlisted in the Imperial German Army and fought in a pioneer regiment during the First World War from June 1917 to November 1918. After the end of the war, he studied law at the University of Göttingen but did not complete his degree. In 1919, he joined the Deutschvölkischer Schutz- und Trutzbund, the largest, most active and most influential antisemitic organization in Germany.

In 1923, Fobke joined the Nazi Party and, in May of that year, became a member of the Stoßtrupp-Hitler (Shock Troop-Hitler), an early personal bodyguard unit for Hitler. As part of this unit, he was a participant in the Beer Hall Putsch of 8–9 November 1923 in Munich. After the collapse of the putsch, Fobke fled but was arrested at the end of January 1924, when apprehended by border police in Berchtesgaden while attempting to smuggle 2,000 copies of an underground Nazi newspaper into Germany from Salzburg.

Fobke stood trial together with 39 other members of the Shock Troop for aiding and abetting high treason and, on 28 April 1924, was sentenced to 15 months in prison with the prospect of early release. Arriving in Landsberg Prison on 20 June 1924, he shared his captivity with Hitler, Rudolf Hess, Hermann Kriebel, Friedrich Weber and 21 other members of the Shock Troop. During his imprisonment, Fobke acted as Hitler's correspondence secretary, communicating by letter with various Party leaders throughout Germany.

In November 1924, he was released from prison and returned to Göttingen, where his fellow student and friend Ludolf Haase had overseen the organization of a Nazi front organization called the National Socialist Landesverband (state association) while the Nazi Party was officially outlawed.

== Nazi Party career ==
After the ban on the Nazi Party was lifted, Fobke rejoined it in March 1925 (membership number 2,775). On 27 March, upon the formation of Gau Göttingen (renamed Hanover-South in December 1925) his friend Haase became the first Gauleiter, with Fobke as Deputy Gauleiter. While in this position, Fobke participated along with Haase in the founding of the National Socialist Working Association on 10 September 1925 in Hagen. This was a consortium of about a dozen Gauleiter of northern and western Germany brought together for mutual coordination of organizational and propaganda resources. The group was also intended to serve as a counterweight to the party leadership in Munich. It was led by Gregor Strasser with Joseph Goebbels as editor of its fortnightly publication (NS-Briefe).

Fobke and Haase, strong advocates of non-participation in electoral politics, viewed this organization as a means to build additional support for their position, and they were able to obtain the group's consensus to advance a resolution to Hitler that pushed strongly for electoral abstention. Under Strasser's leadership, a new draft program was drawn up to replace the Party program of 1920. However, both Fobke and Haase has reservations about the draft, finding it lacked sufficient Völkisch content. Subsequently, Hitler completely repudiated the proposed draft at the Bamberg Conference, a meeting that neither Fobke nor Haase attended, and the Working Association was dissolved shortly thereafter.

From 1928 onward, Fobke's political career ebbed. On 20 July 1928, his patron, Haase, resigned as Gauleiter after being incapacitated by a serious head injury. On 1 October 1928, Gau Hanover-South was absorbed by Gau Hanover-North to form Gau Southern Hanover-Brunswick under Bernhard Rust, and Fobke lost his position as Deputy Gauleiter. From 1928 to 1932, he was a training manager for the Kreis (county) of Groß-Stettin, then from 1932 to 1934, he was Gauinspektor and Chairman of the Party Arbitration Committee for Gau Pomerania. A member of the Sturmabteilung (SA), the Party's paramilitary unit, he was promoted to SA-Sturmführer (1 July 1933), SA-Obersturmführer (9 November 1934) and SA-Sturmbannführer (1935).

During the Second World War, Fobke served in the Wehrmacht from June 1942 as the Sonderführer (special leader) of a propaganda department in the Caucasus. He died of a heart attack in April 1943 in Kerch, during an air raid.

== Sources ==
- Jablonsky, David (1989). The Nazi Party in Dissolution. Frank Cass and Company, Ltd. ISBN 0-71463-322-4.
- Miller, Michael D.; Schulz, Andreas (2012). Gauleiter: The Regional Leaders of the Nazi Party and Their Deputies, 1925–1945. Vol. 1 (Herbert Albrecht - H. Wilhelm Hüttmann). R. James Bender Publishing. ISBN 978-1-932-97021-0.
- Noakes, Jeremy (October 1966). "Conflict and Development in the NSDAP 1924-1927". Journal of Contemporary History. 1 (4). Sage Publications, Ltd.: 19–35. doi:10.1177/002200946600100401. S2CID 154357701.
- Noakes, Jeremy; Pridham, Geoffrey, eds. (1998) [1983]. Nazism 1919-1945, Volume 1: The Rise to Power 1919-1934. University of Exeter Press. ISBN 0-85989 598 X.
- Orlow, Dietrich (1969). The History of the Nazi Party: 1919-1933. University of Pittsburgh Press. ISBN 0-8229-3183-4.
- Stachura, Peter D. (2015). Gregor Strasser and the Rise of Nazism. London: Routledge. ISBN 978-1-138-79862-5.
