= Charcoal Club of Baltimore =

Art club in Baltimore, Maryland

The Charcoal Club has been an arts club in Baltimore, Maryland, United States, on an intermittent basis since 1883.

== History ==
Started as the Sketch Club in 1883 by a group of male artists in Baltimore who "desired to draw and paint from life" (meaning nude models), the Charcoal Club was incorporated in 1885. The founding officers included Adalbert J. Volck. Joseph Evans Sperry, Alfred Winfield Strahan, and Lee Woodward Zeigler. The Club held exhibitions of local and national artists and its "annual juried exhibition of contemporary American art [was]...from 1911 to 1926...the high point of Baltimore's brief art season". The club was also known for its wild annual "Bal des Arts", and in the 1920s many New York City-based artist would attend.

In 1991, the Charcoal Club decided to allow the admission of women artists to the club. The club is known for a focus on traditional art techniques and realism.
