= Randowtal =

- Municipality
- Schwaneberg

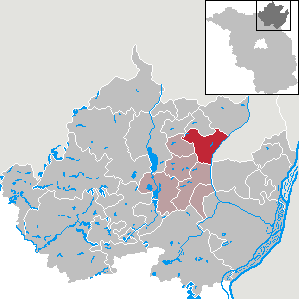
- Location of Randowtal within Uckermark district
- Interactive map of Randowtal
- Location within Germany Location within Brandenburg
- Coordinates: 53°17′53″N 14°02′00″E
- Country: Germany
- State: Brandenburg
- District: Uckermark
- Municipal assoc.: Gramzow

Government
  - Mayor (2024–29): Axel Krumrey

Area
  - Total: 63.71 km^{2} (24.60 sq mi)
- Elevation: 55 m (180 ft)

Population (2025-12-31)
  - Total: 831
  - Density: 13.0/km^{2} (33.8/sq mi)
- Time zone: UTC+01:00 (CET)
  - Summer (DST): UTC+02:00 (CEST)
- Postal codes: 17291
- Dialling codes: 039857, 039862
- Vehicle registration: UM
- Website: www.amtgramzow.de

Randowtal is a municipality in the Uckermark district, in Brandenburg, in north-eastern Germany.

== History ==
During the final stages of World War II, on 5 February 1945, Schwaneberg (now part of the municipality) was the site of a stopover during the German-organised march of some 2,700 French prisoners of war from the Oflag II-B camp headed westwards.

== Demography ==
Development of population since 1875 within the current boundaries (Blue line: Population; Dotted line: Comparison to population development of Brandenburg state; Grey background: Time of Nazi rule; Red background: Time of communist rule)

Randowtal: Population development
within the current boundaries (2017)

Year	Pop.	±% p.a.
1875	1,955	—
1890	1,804	−0.53%
1910	1,950	+0.39%
1925	1,945	−0.02%
1933	1,762	−1.23%
1939	1,776	+0.13%
1946	2,492	+4.96%
1950	2,725	+2.26%
1964	2,099	−1.85%
1971	1,982	−0.82%
1981	1,523	−2.60%
1985	1,499	−0.40%
1989	1,396	−1.76%
1990	1,388	−0.57%

Year	Pop.	±% p.a.
1991	1,318	−5.04%
1992	1,284	−2.58%
1993	1,284	+0.00%
1994	1,259	−1.95%
1995	1,251	−0.64%
1996	1,249	−0.16%
1997	1,240	−0.72%
1998	1,236	−0.32%
1999	1,220	−1.29%
2000	1,192	−2.30%
2001	1,158	−2.85%
2002	1,137	−1.81%
2003	1,101	−3.17%
2004	1,084	−1.54%

Year	Pop.	±% p.a.
2005	1,080	−0.37%
2006	1,082	+0.19%
2007	1,062	−1.85%
2008	1,058	−0.38%
2009	1,065	+0.66%
2010	1,045	−1.88%
2011	1,004	−3.92%
2012	970	−3.39%
2013	941	−2.99%
2014	932	−0.96%
2015	932	+0.00%
2016	920	−1.29%
2017	928	+0.87%

== People ==
- Ernst Schlange (1888-1947), German politician and landowner
