= Führerprinzip =

Principle of political authority in Nazi Germany

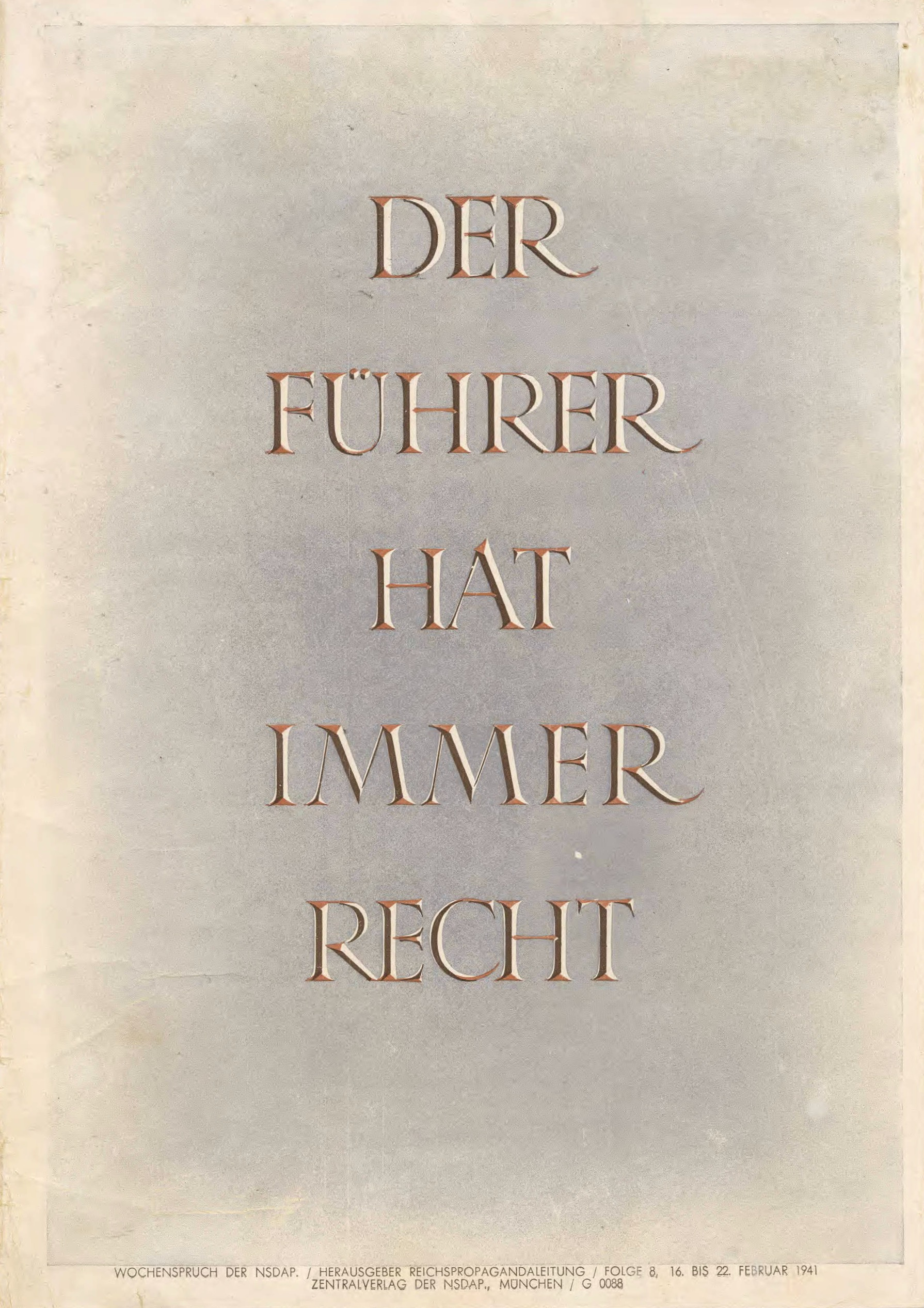
Official poster from the Wochenspruch der NSDAP series, 16 February 1941. The inscription reads: "The Führer is always right".

The Führerprinzip (German pronunciation: [ˈfyːʀɐpʀɪnˌtsiːp] lit. 'Leader Principle') was the basis of executive authority in the government of Nazi Germany. It placed Adolf Hitler's word above all written law, and meant that government policies, decisions, and officials all served to realize his will. In practise, the Führerprinzip gave Hitler totalitarian power over the ideology and policies of his political party; this form of personal dictatorship was a basic characteristic of Nazism. The state itself received "political authority" from Hitler, and the Führerprinzip stipulated that only what the Führer "commands, allows, or does not allow is our conscience," with party leaders pledging "eternal allegiance to Adolf Hitler."

According to Deputy Führer Rudolf Hess, the Nazi German political system meant "unconditional authority downwards, and responsibility upwards." At each level of the pyramidal power structure the sub-leader, or Unterführer, was subordinate to the superior leader, and responsible to him for all successes and failures. "As early as July 1921," Hitler proclaimed the Führerprinzip as the "law of the Nazi Party," and in Mein Kampf he said the principle would govern the new Reich. At the Bamberg Conference on 14 February 1926, Hitler invoked the Führerprinzip to assert his power, and affirmed his total authority over Nazi administrators at the party membership meeting in Munich on 2 August 1928.

The Nazi government implemented the Führerprinzip throughout German civil society. Business organizations and civil institutions were thus led by an appointed leader, rather than managed by an elected committee of professional experts. This included the schools, both public and private, the sports associations, and the factories. Beginning in 1934, the German armed forces swore a "Führer Oath" to Hitler personally, not the German constitution. As a common theme of Nazi propaganda, the "Leader Principle" compelled obedience to the supreme leader who—by personal command—could override the rule of law as exercised by elected parliaments, appointed committees, and bureaucracies. The German cultural reverence for national leaders such as King Frederick the Great (r. 1740–1786) and Chancellor Otto von Bismarck (r. 1871–1890), and the historic example of the Nordic saga, were also appropriated to support the idea. The ultranationalist "Leader Principle" vested "complete and all-embracing" authority in the "myth person" of Hitler who, as Rudolf Hess declared in 1934, "was always right and will always be right."

== Ideology ==
The political-science term Führerprinzip was coined by Hermann von Keyserling (1880–1946), a Baltic German philosopher. Ideologically, the Führerprinzip sees organizations as a hierarchy of leaders, wherein each leader (German: Führer) has absolute responsibility in, and for, his own area of authority, is owed absolute obedience from subordinates, and answers to his superior officers; the subordinates' obedience also includes personal loyalty to the leader. In both theory and practice, the Führerprinzip made Adolf Hitler supreme leader of the German nation.

=== The total state ===
By presenting Hitler as the incarnation of authority—a saviour-politician who personally dictates the law—the Führerprinzip functioned as a color of law legalism that conferred executive, judicial, and legislative powers of government on the person of Hitler as Führer und Reichskanzler (Leader and State Chancellor), the combined leader and chancellor of Germany. For example, following the 1934 Night of the Long Knives, Hitler justified his violent political purge of Ernst Röhm and the Strasserite faction of the Nazi Party as a matter of German national security, and stated: "In this hour, I was responsible for the fate of the German nation and was therefore the supreme judge of the German people!"

As a proponent of the Führerprinzip, the German legal theorist Carl Schmitt (1888–1985) defended the political purges and the felony crimes of the Nazis individually, and the Nazi Party collectively, because the Führerprinzip stipulated that the Führer's word supersedes any contradictory law. In the book The Legal Basis of the Total State (1933), Schmitt stated that the Führerprinzip was the ideological and political foundation of the Nazi German total state, writing:

The strength of the National Socialist State lies in the fact that it is [ruled] from top to bottom and in every atom of its existence ruled and permeated with the concept of leadership (German: Führertum). This principle [of leadership], which made the movement strong, must be carried through systematically, both in the administration of the State and in the various spheres of self-government, naturally taking into account the [ideologic] modifications required by the particular area in question. But it would not be permissible for any important area of public life to operate independently from the Führer concept.

=== Political cohesion ===
In the Nazi Party, the "Leader Principle" came to be considered integral to political cohesion. In July 1921, to affirm personal control of the Nazi Party, Hitler confronted Anton Drexler—the original founder of the Nazi Party—to thwart Drexler's proposal to unite the Nazi Party with the larger German Socialist Party. Fervently opposed to this idea, Hitler angrily left the Nazi Party on 11 July 1921. However, understanding that the absence of Hitler would destroy the party's credibility, party-committee members accepted Hitler's demand to replace Drexler as party chairman, and Hitler rejoined.

The increased number of party members split into two ideological factions; the northern faction (led by Otto Strasser and Gregor Strasser) of the Nazi Party championed the Third Position politics of Strasserism (revolutionary nationalism and economic antisemitism); the southern faction (led by Hitler himself) of the party followed Hitler's brand of Nazism. The two factions greatly disagreed about the Führerprinzip, and whether or not it was an essential principle for the party. On 14 February 1926, at the Bamberg Conference, Hitler defeated all factional opposition and established the Führerprinzip as the managing principle of the Nazi Party.

=== Leader Principle in action ===
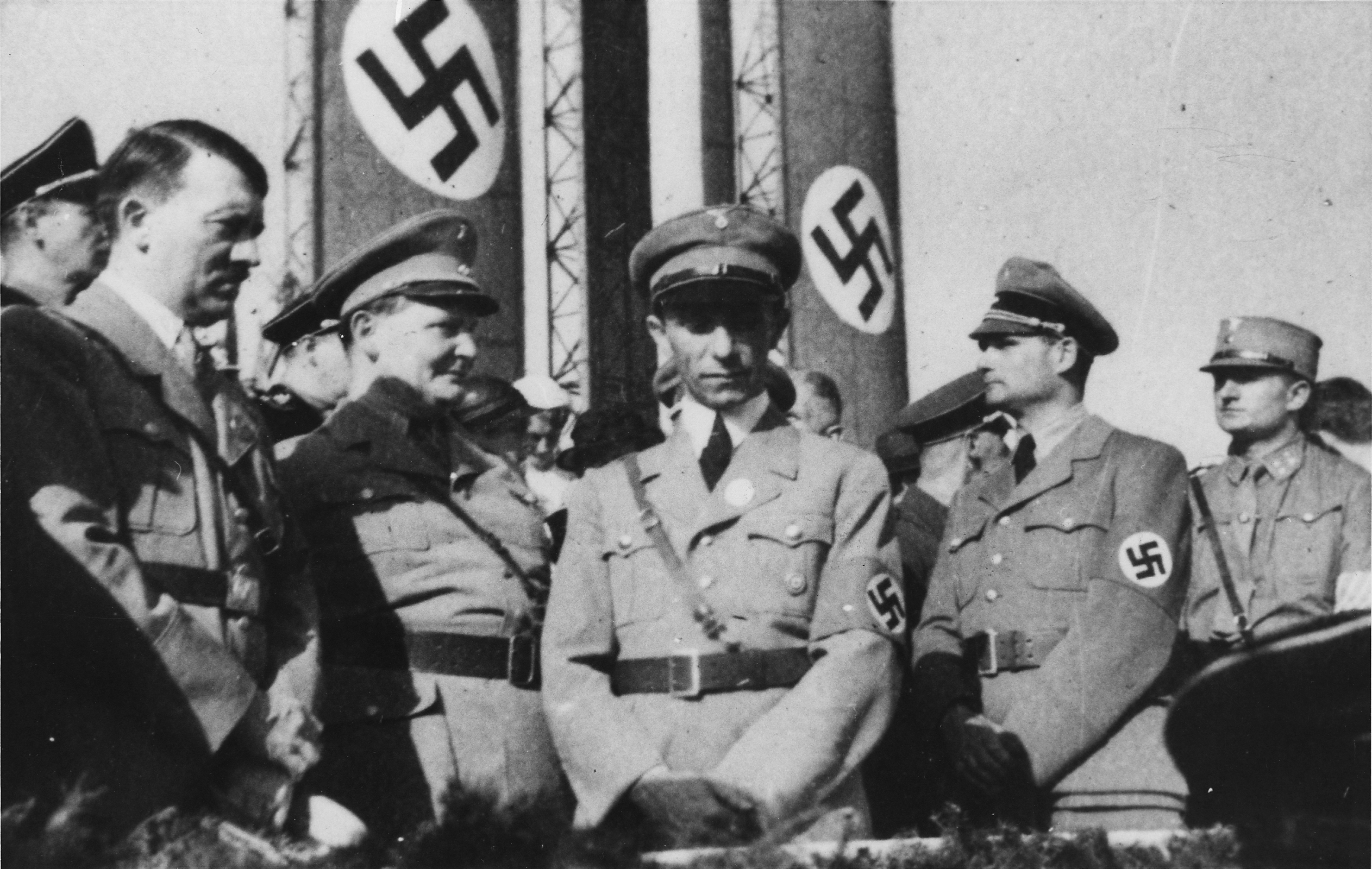
The Führerprinzip allowed Hitler, Hermann Göring, Joseph Goebbels, and Rudolf Hess to politically purge the Nazi Party on the Night of the Long Knives in the summer of 1934.

In 1934, Hitler imposed the Führerprinzip on the government and civil society of Weimar Germany in order to establish the Nazi state. While the fascist government did not require the German business community to adopt Nazi techniques of administration, it did mandate that companies rename their management hierarchies using the language of the Führerprinzip ideology.

With regard to the ultimate value of subordinates' input, Hermann Göring told British ambassador Sir Nevile Henderson: "When a decision has to be taken, none of us counts more than the stones on which we are standing. It is the Führer, alone, who decides". Following the adoption of the "Führer Oath" by the German armed forces in 1934, Hitler wrote a public letter to Defense Minister Werner von Blomberg, saying, "Just as the officers and soldiers of the Wehrmacht bind themselves to the new state in my person, so shall I always regard it as my highest duty to defend the existence and inviolability of the Wehrmacht in fulfillment of the testament of the late field marshal and, faithful to my own will, to anchor the army in the nation as the sole bearer of arms."

== Propaganda ==
Nazi propaganda films promoted the Führerprinzip as a basis for the organization of the civil society of Germany. In the 1933 film Flüchtlinge, the hero rescues refugee Volga Germans from Communist persecution by a leader who requires unquestioning obedience. Der Herrscher altered the source material to depict the hero, Clausen, as the stalwart leader of his munitions company, who, when faced with the machinations of his children, decides to disown them and bestows the company to the state, confident that there will arise a factory worker who is a true leader of men capable of continuing Clausen's work. In the 1941 film Carl Peters the protagonist is a decisive man of action who fights and defeats the African natives to establish German colonies in Africa, but Peters is thwarted by a parliament who does not understand that German society needs the Führerprinzip. In the 1945 Kolberg, when Gneisenau is set to the city to defend it, he insists on control, telling Nettelbeck that there must be a leader.

At school, adolescent boys were taught Nordic sagas as the literary illustration of the Führerprinzip possessed by the German heroes Frederick the Great and Otto von Bismarck.

This was combined with the glorification of the one, central Führer, Adolf Hitler. During the Night of the Long Knives, Nazi propaganda claimed that Hitler's decisive action saved Germany, though it meant (in Goebbels's description) suffering "tragic loneliness" from being a Siegfried forced to shed blood to preserve Germany. In one speech Robert Ley explicitly proclaimed "The Führer is always right." Booklets given out for the Winter Relief donations included The Führer Makes History, a collection of Hitler photographs, and The Führer’s Battle in the East Films such as Der Marsch zum Führer and Triumph of the Will glorified him.

== War crime defense ==
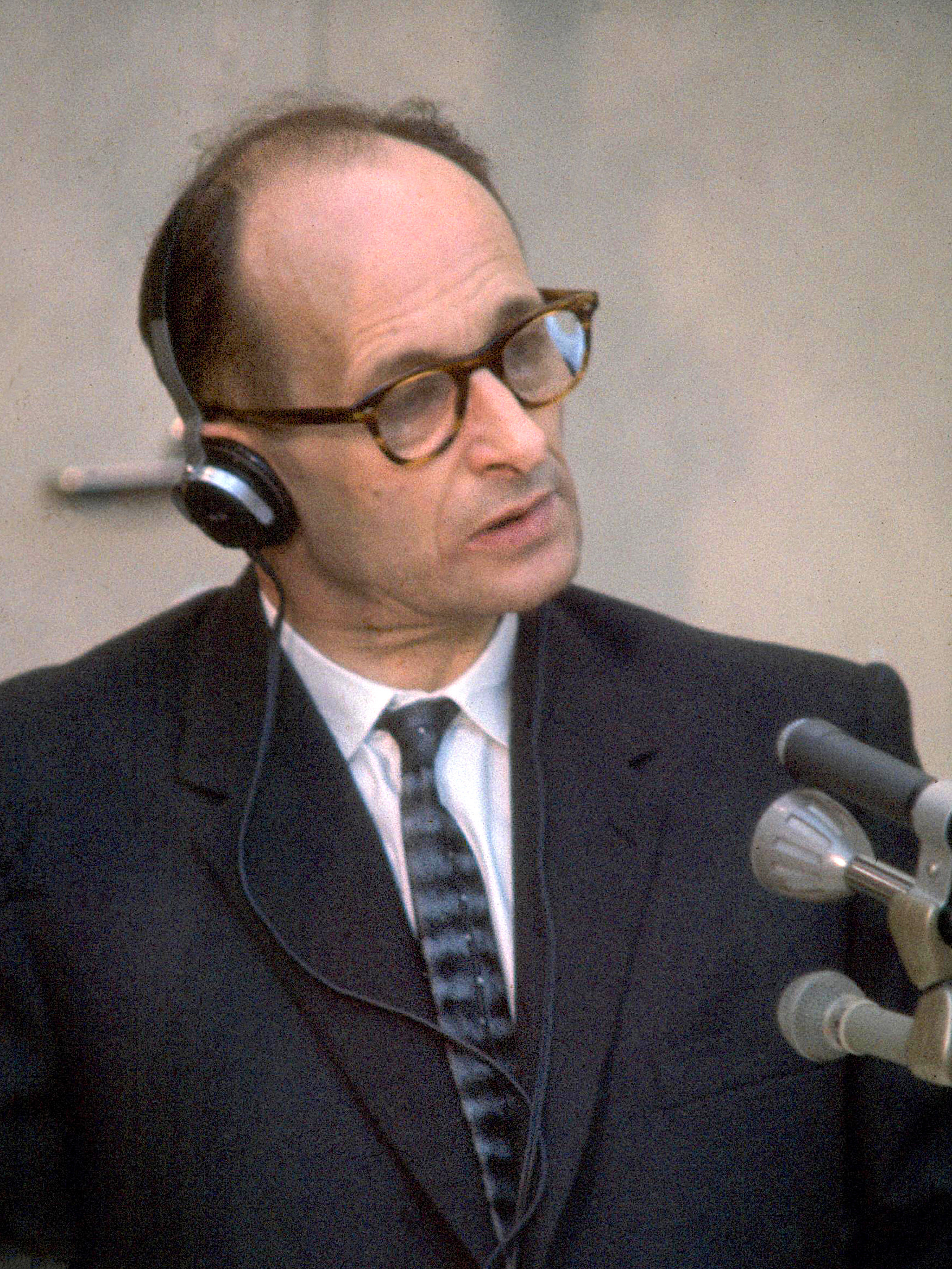
At trial in Israel in 1961, the Nazi war criminal Adolf Eichmann said that the Führerprinzip excused his actions because he was obeying superior orders.

In the aftermath of the Second World War, at the Allied war-crime Nuremberg trials (1945–1946) of captured Nazi leaders in Germany, and at the Eichmann Trial (1961) in Israel, the criminal defence arguments presented the Führerprinzip as a concept of jurisprudence that voided the military command responsibility of the accused war criminals, because they were military officers following superior orders.

In the book Eichmann in Jerusalem (1963), Hannah Arendt said that, aside from a personal desire to improve his career as an administrator, Eichmann did not manifest antisemitism or any psychological abnormality. That Eichmann personified the banality of evil given the commonplace personality Eichmann displayed at trial, which communicated neither feelings of guilt nor feelings of hatred whilst he denied personal responsibility for his war crimes. In his defense, Eichmann said he was "doing his job", and that he always tried to act in accordance with the categorical imperative proposed in the deontological moral philosophy of Immanuel Kant.

== See also ==
- Autocracy
- Charisma
- Corpse-like obedience (Kadavergehorsam)
- Cult of personality
- Functionalism versus intentionalism
- General Will
- Gleichschaltung
- Meine Ehre heißt Treue
- Milgram experiment
- Nuremberg Defense
- Papal infallibility
- State of exception
- Supreme Leader (disambiguation)
- Superior orders
- Unitary executive theory
- Unrechtsstaat
