= Reich Ministry for Church Affairs =

Organization in Germany

- Reichsministerium für die Kirchliche Angelegenheiten

Agency overview
- Formed: 16 July 1935
- Dissolved: 8 May 1945
- Jurisdiction: Government of Nazi Germany
- Ministers responsible: Hanns Kerrl †; Hermann Muhs (as State Secretary)

The Reich Ministry for Church Affairs (Reichsministerium für die Kirchliche Angelegenheiten) also sometimes referred to as the Reich Ministry for Ecclesiastical Affairs, existed in Nazi Germany from 1935 until 1945 under the leadership of Hanns Kerrl and Hermann Muhs and attempted to unify the churches and align them with the goals of National Socialism.

== Background ==
As part of the Nazi approach to controlling all aspects of German society (Gleichschaltung) the regime's initial plan was to "coordinate" all 28 separate Protestant regional churches (Landeskirchen) into a single and unitary Reich Church (Reichskirche) under the leadership of a Reich Bishop. On 27 September 1933, the Nazis installed Ludwig Müller in this position. However, many of the German Protestant clergy supported the dissenting Confessing Church movement, formed in May 1934 under the leadership of theologian Martin Niemöller, which resisted state interference into Church affairs and affirmed that the German Church was not an "organ of the State." Müller was ultimately unsuccessful in establishing a unified Church or in completely Nazifying the Protestant congregations. Therefore, Nazi dictator Adolf Hitler determined that the government itself would have to take over the direction of this effort.

== Establishment ==
The Reich Ministry of Church Affairs was established by a decree of 16 July 1936, creating for the first time in Germany an independent, centralized government ministry with responsibility for the Reich's religious life. Religious affairs had previously been handled by departments in the Reich and Prussian ministries of the Interior and Science, Education & Culture. At its formation, Reichsminister without portfolio, Hanns Kerrl, was named Reichsminister of the newly established cabinet department. Hermann Muhs, was appointed his permanent deputy on 19 November, and on 19 April 1937 was named State Secretary.

== History and Actions of the Ministry ==
At first, the moderate and cautious Kerrl had some success by marginalizing the abrasive and ineffective Reich Bishop Müller and by setting up a Church Committee on 3 October 1935 under the leadership of respected theologian Wilhelm Zoellner to attempt to work out a settlement among the opposing groups.

However, Kerrl decreed the Church to be subordinate to his new bureaucracy and that the parallel institutions of the Confessing Church were to be dissolved. The Confessing Church opposed these measures, maintaining that it was the only legitimate Church. On 4 June 1936, it addressed a letter to Hitler protesting the anti-Christian policies of the regime, denouncing its anti-Semitism and demanding an end to State interference in Church issues. This letter was also published abroad and spurred a ruthless backlash from the regime, closing down theological seminaries, confiscating Church funds and having the Gestapo arrest hundreds of Confessional Church pastors. In February 1937 Zoellner resigned, feeling that these strong-arm tactics undercut his efforts, and the Church Committee passed out of existence. In July 1937, Niemöller himself was among the 800 pastors arrested that year. He would be incarcerated in concentration camps at Sachsenhausen and Dachau from 1938 to the end of the regime. The Church resistance, though not completely broken, was somewhat subdued. In the face of the increasing Nazi terror campaign, the majority of remaining pastors by 1938 submitted to taking a personal oath of allegiance to Hitler.

An undercurrent of opposition continued, driven underground by the repressive measures. Ultimately, Kerrl and his Ministry did not succeed in their aim of establishing a unified and compliant Reich Church. Kerrl lost the confidence of Hitler and the regime effectively abandoned the effort at institutional coordination. As the Second World War loomed and consumed an increasing amount of the regime's time and energy, the conflict over the Church correspondingly diminished. Hitler proclaimed a “civil truce” in Church affairs for the duration of the war.

After the death of Kerrl from a heart attack on 15 December 1941, Muhs was named Acting Leader of the Reich Ministry for Church Affairs, while continuing in his position as State Secretary. He assumed the duties of the deceased Reichsminister, though without the official title, and served until the downfall of the Nazi regime.

== Administrators ==
No.	Portrait	Name (born-died)	Term of office			Political party	Government	Ref.
No.	Portrait	Name (born-died)	Took office	Left office	Time in office	Political party	Government	Ref.
1		Hanns Kerrl (1887–1941)	16 July 1935	15 December 1941 †	6 years, 152 days	NSDAP	Hitler	
2		Hermann Muhs (1894–1962) (as State Secretary)	15 December 1941	8 May 1945	3 years, 144 days	NSDAP	Hitler	

== See also ==
- German Evangelical Church
- Kirchenkampf
- Religion in Nazi Germany
