= Adalbert J. Volck =

American cartoonist

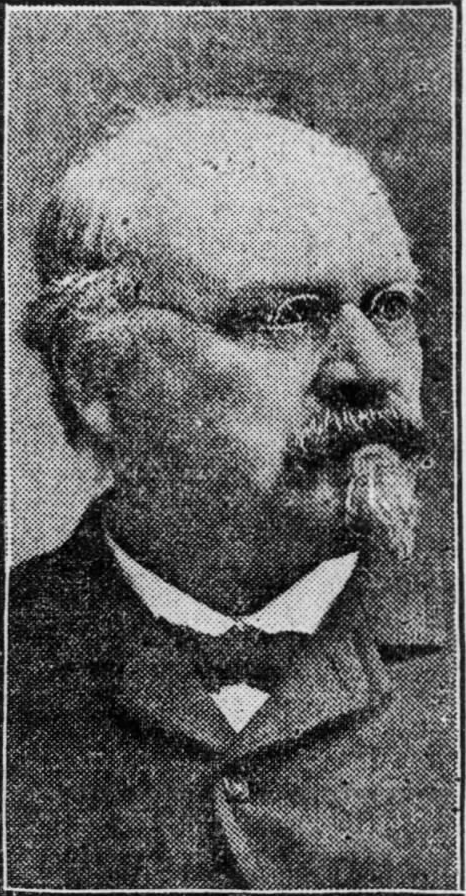
- Born: April 14, 1828; Augsburg, Bavaria
- Died: March 25, 1912 (aged 83); Baltimore, Maryland, US
- Education: Baltimore College of Dental Surgery (DDS)
- Known for: Caricatures, Political cartoons
- Spouse: Letitia Roberta Alleyn

Adalbert J. Volck (1828–1912) was a dentist, political cartoonist, and caricaturist. Born in Augsburg, Bavaria, he resided for most of his life in Baltimore, Maryland. A dentist by profession, Volck is best known for his support of the Confederacy during the American Civil War through his political cartoons, which has led him to be described as "the Northern art world's most famous Confederate sympathizer." Volck's support for the Confederacy extended beyond his cartoons, including smuggling items for the Confederate army, and acting as a personal courier for President Jefferson Davis.

== Early life ==
Volck was born April 14, 1828, in Augsburg, Bavaria, the third of thirteen children born to Andreas Volck, a vinegar maker. He received his education in art in Nuremberg and Munich.

== Move to America ==
Upon arriving in America, Volck initially joined a brother-in-law in St. Louis, before following the California Gold Rush west in 1849.

Volck had previously studied dentistry in Germany, and resumed that profession in Baltimore. While working under the supervision of Chapin A. Harris, he received his dentistry degree from the Baltimore College of Dental Surgery in 1852 with a thesis on the subject of "nerves." After graduating in Baltimore, he established a lifelong practice there. Volck was known for his work on porcelain restoration techniques.

Volck was a member of many of elite Baltimore's social clubs, including the Athenaeum Club, and James Innes Randolph's Whitebait Club. He was a founding member of Baltimore's Wednesday Club, an arts and culture society influential in the city during the latter 19th century. Volck was also a founding member of the Charcoal Club of Baltimore, a prominent artists' group.

== Artistic output ==
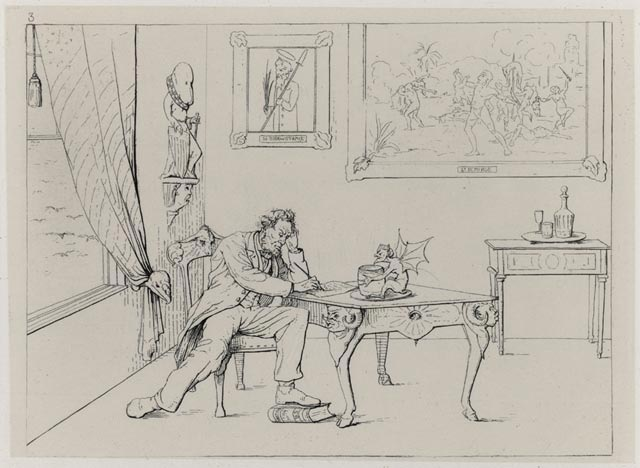
Caricature of Lincoln writing the Emancipation Proclamation, a political cartoon by Volck

Beyond sketches and cartoons, Volck's areas of artistic skill included landscape painting, silver smithing and sculpting. Volck's metalworks included copper and silver brooches and shields, including one fashioned after the nibelungenlied. He also designed a giant brass growler for the use of the Charcoal Club, which was cast by famous Baltimore silversmith W.F. Jacobi and remains in the club's possession for use in ceremonies.

== Death ==
Volck injured both knees in an accident, following which he retired from his dentistry practice, focusing his final years on landscape paintings based on sketches he had made of the American West. He died at his home on Linden Avenue on March 26, 1912. After his death, an acquaintance wrote to The Baltimore Sun that Volck "deeply regretted" having caricatured Lincoln, "whom he had entirely misunderstood."
