= Hermann Muhs =

Nazi Party official and politician (1894–1962)

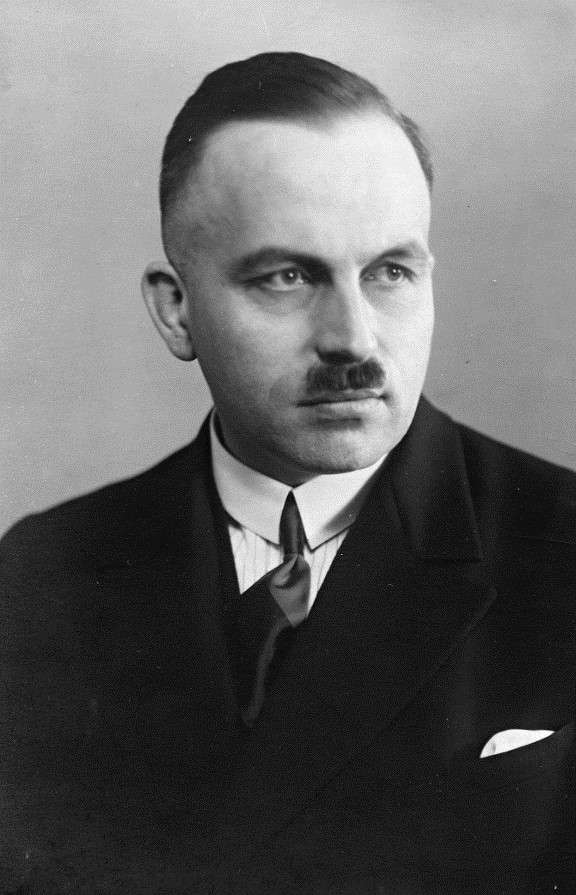
- Hermann Muhs, c. 1933

Leader Reich Ministry for Church Affairs
- In office 14 December 1941 – 8 May 1945
- Preceded by: Hanns Kerrl
- Succeeded by: Position abolished

State Secretary Reich Ministry for Church Affairs
- In office 19 April 1937 – 8 May 1945

Leader Reich Office for Regional Planning
- In office 14 December 1941 – 8 May 1945
- Preceded by: Hanns Kerrl
- Succeeded by: Position abolished

Regierungspräsident Regierungsbezirk Hildesheim
- In office 25 March 1933 – 9 April 1937
- Preceded by: Leopold Höhnen
- Succeeded by: Traugott Bredow

Deputy Gauleiter Gau Southern Hanover-Brunswick
- In office 7 October 1930 – 17 August 1932
- Preceded by: Karl Dincklage
- Succeeded by: Gerret Korsemann

Gauleiter Gau Southern Hanover-Brunswick
- In office 17 August 1932 – 15 December 1932
- Preceded by: Bernhard Rust
- Succeeded by: Bernhard Rust

Deputy Gauleiter Gau Southern Hanover-Brunswick
- In office 15 December 1932 – 15 April 1933
- Preceded by: Gerret Korsemann
- Succeeded by: Kurt Schmalz

Personal details
- Born: 16 May 1894 Barlissen, Province of Hanover, Kingdom of Prussia, German Empire
- Died: 13 April 1962 (aged 67) Göttingen, West Germany
- Party: Nazi Party
- Education: University of Göttingen
- Profession: Lawyer

Military service
- Allegiance: German Empire
- Branch/service: Imperial German Army; Luftstreitkräfte
- Years of service: 1914–1920
- Rank: Leutnant
- Unit: Field Artillery Regiment 46; Field Artillery Regiment 254; Field Artillery Regiment 43
- Battles/wars: World War I
- Awards: Iron Cross, 2nd Class

Hermann Muhs (16 May 1894 – 13 April 1962) was a German lawyer and Nazi Party politician who served as State Secretary and leader of the Reich Ministry for Church Affairs (Reichsministerium für die Kirchlichen Angelegenheiten) in Nazi Germany.

== Early life ==
The son of a farmer, Muhs attended school in Göttingen and graduated in 1914. He volunteered for military service in the First World War and served successively with Field Artillery Regiments 46, 254 and 43. He saw action on the Western Front and was wounded twice, earning the Iron Cross, 2nd Class. In 1917, he transferred to the Luftstreitkräfte (Imperial Air Force), trained as a pilot, and served with Jagdstaffel 12 until shot down and captured by the French in the autumn of 1918. When released from custody, he returned to Germany and was discharged from service as a Leutnant of reserves in the spring of 1920.

Muhs studied economics and law at the University of Göttingen and received his doctorate in law in 1922. He passed his first state law exams and was employed as a junior barrister with the regional court in Celle until 1926. Passing his second state law exams in 1926, he became a court assessor in the District Court in Hanover. He then opened a law firm in Göttingen where he worked as an attorney and a notary until 1933.

== Early Nazi career ==
On 1 September 1929 he joined the Nazi Party (membership number 152,594). In November he was elected to the Citizens Council in Göttingen and was the Nazi Party faction leader there through March 1933. By 1930, he was the Party Bezirksleiter (District Leader) in Southern Hanover Province. On 7 October 1930, Muhs succeeded Karl Dincklage as Deputy Gauleiter for the Gau Southern Hanover-Brunswick. He also served as the Gau Organization Leader and the Kreisleiter (County Leader) of Kreis Göttingen from September 1931. In 1932, he became a member of the Provincial Landtag of the Province of Hanover, also serving as the Nazi Party faction leader. On 24 April 1932, Muhs was elected to the Prussian Landtag, serving until March of the following year.

On 17 August 1932 Muhs succeeded Bernhard Rust as Gauleiter of Gau Southern Hanover-Brunswick when Rust was promoted to the new position of Landesinspekteur, overseeing several Gaue. However, Muh's tenure was brief, as the new position was abolished in December 1932 and Rust returned as Gauleiter. Muhs resumed his position as Deputy Gauleiter, serving until 15 April 1933.

After the Nazi seizure of power, Muhs became Regierungspräsident of the Hildesheim Regierungsbezirk (Government Region) on 25 March 1933, serving until April 1937. He was also named Chairman of the Administrative Court in Hildesheim. Also in 1933, he was appointed to the Prussian Provinzialrat (Provincial Council) for the Province of Hanover, as well as being named the provincial representative to the Reichsrat until its dissolution on 14 February 1934. Muhs also became a member of the League of National Socialist German Lawyers (BNSDJ) in 1933.

== Reich Ministry for Church Affairs ==
In July 1933, Muhs became a Senator for the State Church of Hanover. Then on 19 November 1936, he was named the Permanent Deputy to the Reichsminister for Church Affairs, Hanns Kerrl. This was followed on 19 April 1937 by his appointment as Staatssekretär (State Secretary) and Leader of the Central Department of the Ministry. Also, Prussian Minister president Hermann Göring appointed him as a member of the Prussian State Council.

One of the most implacable persecutors of the churches, his heavy handed efforts to bring them into line with Nazi ideology repeatedly met with resistance in church circles. This repudiation of his actions by the churches resulted in a loss of confidence in him. Kerrl responded by limiting the number of Muhs' speeches and public appearances.

Muhs had been a member of the Schutzstaffel (SS) since 1 June 1931. He attained the rank of SS-Oberführer on 9 November 1938 and was attached to the staff of Reichsführer Heinrich Himmler. However, on 17 March 1941, Muhs attended the funeral of Cardinal Karl Joseph Schulte in Cologne Cathedral wearing his SS uniform. This was against the orders of Himmler, who sought to enforce a strict separation between the SS and the Church. Therefore, on 2 April, Muhs was expelled from the SS.

Despite this setback, after the death of Hanns Kerrl on 14 December 1941, Muhs was named Acting Leader of the Reich Ministry for Church Affairs. He assumed the duties of the deceased Reichsminister, though without the official title. His appointment was made permanent on 16 January 1942 and he continued to head the Ministry until the end of the Nazi regime on 8 May 1945. He retained his position as State Secretary and also succeeded Kerrl as Leader of the Reich Office of Regional Planning.

== Postwar life ==
After the fall of the Nazi regime, Muhs was interned by Allied authorities in June 1945. He was at first acquitted by a Denazification Court in Bielefeld on 16 April 1948. This was rescinded on 28 January 1949, and on 26 May 1951 Muhs was re-classified as Category III, a "lesser offender". He was not further incarcerated and in 1952 he resumed legal work in Göttingen, dying there on 13 April 1962.

== Sources ==
- Conway, John S. (1968). The Nazi Persecution of the Churches, 1933–1945. Basic Books Inc. ISBN 978-0465049-07-3.
- Lilla, Joachim (2005). Der Preußische Staatsrat 1921–1933: Ein biographisches Handbuch. Düsseldorf: Droste Verlag. ISBN 978-3-770-05271-4.
- Miller, Michael D.; Schulz, Andreas (2017). Gauleiter: The Regional Leaders of the Nazi Party and Their Deputies, 1925-1945. Vol. II (Georg Joel - Dr. Bernhard Rust). R. James Bender Publishing. ISBN 978-1-932970-32-6.
- Zentner, Christian; Bedürftig, Friedemann (1997). The Encyclopedia of the Third Reich. Da Capo Press. ISBN 0-306-80793-9.
