= Bamberg Conference =

1926 Nazi meeting

The Bamberg Conference (German: Bamberger Führertagung) included some sixty members of the leadership of the Nazi Party, and was specially convened by Adolf Hitler in Bamberg, in Upper Franconia, Germany, on Sunday 14 February 1926 during the "wilderness years" of the party.

Hitler's purposes in convening the ad hoc conference embraced at least the following:

- to curtail dissent within the party that had arisen among members of its northern branches and to foster party unity based upon—and only upon—the "leadership principle" (Führerprinzip)
- to establish without controversy his position as the sole, absolute and unquestioned ultimate authority within the party, whose decisions are final and non-appealable
- to eliminate any notion that the party was in any way a democratic or consensus-based institution
- to eradicate bickering between the northern and southern factions of the party over ideology and goals
- to establish the Twenty-Five Point Programme as constituting the party's "immutable" programme

== Background ==
To achieve his objectives, Hitler had to pressure the dissident northern faction to accept the leadership of Munich and to adhere without question to the Führerprinzip. His decision to convene the Bamberg Conference was something of a gamble—it could have provoked an express revolt by the northern faction or otherwise exacerbated the north-south conflict, leading to a rupture—but Hitler chose to nip a possible nascent rebellion in the bud. He correctly believed that the dissidents lacked both the heart and the stomach to press their dissent, and that their true intent was not to challenge his leadership but to "rescue" him from the "reactionary" forces of the Munich clique, who had by default come to dominate the party whilst Hitler served his 30-month jail term in Landsberg Prison for his role in the Beer Hall Putsch (during which he also completed Mein Kampf).

=== Gregor Strasser ===
Soon after Hitler was banned from public speaking in Bavaria on 9 March 1925, he appointed Gregor Strasser to develop the party in the north. Strasser, a hard-working and gregarious pharmacist of forceful personality who read Homer in the original for relaxation, was an effective public speaker, had exceptional organizational talents and dramatically increased the number of Nazi cells in the north from 71 after the putsch to 262 by the end of 1925.

Strasser was more idealistic than Hitler and took the notion of "socialist" in the party name with some degree of seriousness. The Communists were a larger factor in the more industrialized north, and Strasser was sensitive to the appeal that "socialism" had to those dissatisfied workers who were tempted by the red flag. He also apparently felt that the Munich clique was ruled by lesser men, and he chafed under their leadership in Hitler's absence.

Strasser was more radical than Hitler on the issue of adherence to the "legal and constitutional" method of obtaining political power through the Weimar Constitution's electoral processes. He had been the SA leader in Lower Bavaria before the Beer Hall Putsch and was not convinced that Hitler's repudiation of force, violence and putsch as a path to political power was correct.

Most serious, perhaps, was the attitude of the northern faction to the party's Twenty-Five Point Programme, which indisputably was intellectually confused and often half-baked. Considering the circumstances in which it was written, it is hard to imagine that it could be otherwise. To Strasser and Goebbels, men with intellectual and ideological bents, the absence of intellectual rigor was a serious defect.

=== The Hagen meeting ===
Strasser first convened a meeting of the party leaders of about a dozen northern Gaue in Hagen, Westphalia on 10 September 1925. The meeting failed to accomplish much, as Strasser was absent due to his mother's serious illness. Nevertheless, the delegates unanimously rejected the strategy of electoral participation, formed the National Socialist Working Association (Full name: Working Association of the Northern and Western German Gaue of the NSDAP), enacted statutes to govern the organization, established a fortnightly publication called the National Socialist Letters (Nationalsozialistische Briefe) with Goebbels as editor, and respectfully notified Hitler in writing of these developments. In no way was this an open revolt against Hitler or an attempted secession from the NSDAP; Hitler gave his approval to the formation of the Association. The members of the Working Association were by statute dedicated to work "in the comradely spirit of National Socialism under the leadership of Adolf Hitler."

Nevertheless, the organization's intent to reshape the programme of National Socialism threatened Hitler's absolute authority. The underlying premise of the Working Association was, in effect, democratic: neither Munich headquarters nor the Führer could have all the answers and the best solution was a comradely, communal and cooperative effort by concerned Party members, who would combine their skills and intelligence to formulate a winning programme.

=== The Hanover meeting ===
In November 1925 Strasser produced his own draft programme, and circulated it among the dissidents. It basically proposed a corporate state, with peasants tied to their land in a quasi-feudalistic manner and with the means of production under government control, while private property rights were nevertheless respected. The most inflammatory provision was the advocacy of expropriation of princely estates, such as the Hohenzollerns and the Wittelsbachs. The draft was often incoherent and vague, however, and it promoted controversy even among the northerners. On 24 January 1926 a meeting of the dissidents in Hanover became extraordinarily heated when Gottfried Feder appeared (uninvited but as Hitler's representative) and objected strenuously to the proposed programme in any form. As a result, the conferees opted to shelve the Strasser draft, and further work on a new proposal was delegated to a small group.

They did, however, support the initiative to expropriate, without compensation, the landholdings of the German princes, an issue which would be the subject of an upcoming plebiscite; the expropriation initiative had been sponsored by the Left, including the Communists. The dissidents also passed a resolution to start a new publishing house, the Kampfverlag, which would operate a new party newspaper for the north, Der Nationale Sozialist. The proposed newspaper would obviously compete with the Party's Völkischer Beobachter. Some Gauleiter were even so bold as to criticize Hitler, although the resolution that was adopted expressly stated that the northerners did not intend to displace the leadership decisions of Munich and that, in any case, the expropriation issue was "not one which touches on the fundamental interests of the party."

Feder, fuming at the audacity of the northerners, reported back to Hitler, who in due course called for a leadership conference in Bamberg, to be held on 14 February 1926.

== The 14 February conference ==
Bamberg was chosen as it was situated as close to the northern Gaue as possible, while still remaining on Bavarian soil; additionally, a Sunday was probably chosen to make the conference more convenient for all, but in particular for the northerners, who would have longer distances to negotiate. Streicher had also done a good job in gaining support in the area for the Party, and the Bamberg branch was both large and devoted to the authority of Munich. Hitler of course could use the popular support as a further weapon in his propaganda to coerce the rambunctious northerners into line. The local Nazis turned out to demonstrate in favor of Hitler, which must have impressed the northern visitors.

There was no debate; Hitler was not in the habit of debating with his entourage in any event, and he had no intention of engaging in any such quasi-democratic practice at Bamberg. The conference was a typical lengthy Hitlerian monologue. At the conference, Hitler drew from Mein Kampf, the first volume of which was principally written while he served his time in the comforts of Landsberg Prison. And his rejection of the Working Association's programme was complete, oblique and effective.

Foreign Policy. Alliances were purely pragmatic, according to Hitler. The Working Association had suggested alliance with Russia. This, Hitler emphasized, was impossible. It would constitute the "bolshevization of Germany" and "national suicide." Germany's salvation would come instead by acquisition of living space in the East: Germany would have Lebensraum, at Russian expense. This colonial policy would be accomplished, as in the Middle Ages, by the sword.

Expropriation. He stated without equivocation that the uncompensated expropriation of the princes was contrary to the party's aims. "There are for us today no princes, only Germans.... We stand on the basis of law, and we will not give a Jewish system of exploitation a legal excuse for the complete plundering of our people."

Sectarianism. Furthermore, the objections of the mainly Protestant northerners to the toleration of Catholicism by the Bavarians would be studiously ignored. Religious questions such as this had, according to Hitler, no place in the National Socialist movement. The party aimed to create a people's community, a 'Volksgemeinschaft' in which all true Germans would bond together for national unity.

The Twenty-Five Points. The Party programme would not be changed. It was the foundation of all Nazi ideology. "To tamper with it would be treason to those [principally the "martyrs" of the Beer Hall Putsch] who died believing in our idea."

But Hitler's major thrust was not programmatic. He offered the dissidents an alternative methodology. The party was based not on program, but on the principle of the leader. The party leadership therefore had a simple choice: either accept or reject him as the unquestioned leader. Toland astutely places Hitler's ultimatum in Messianic terms: "National Socialism was a religion and Hitler was its Christ. Crucified at the Feldherrnhalle and risen after Landsberg, he had returned to lead the movement and the nation to salvation."

The dissent evaporated after this. Strasser made a short statement in which he accepted the Führer's leadership and Hitler put his arm around Strasser in a show of comradeship. Strasser agreed to have the recipients of the alternative program return their copies to him. Goebbels did not speak at all, dismaying his fellow northern delegates.

== Aftermath ==
Hitler continued his efforts to conciliate both Strasser and Goebbels. As to Strasser, Hitler approved the establishment of the new publishing house under Strasser's control. He allowed Strasser to merge two Gaue (Westphalia and Rhineland-North) into one new and more powerful entity named the Großgau Ruhr, with Goebbels, Pfeffer and Kaufmann as a ruling triumvirate. To placate Strasser, he even removed Esser from his position as Propaganda Leader in the party's leadership cadre in April 1926 and eventually gave the post to Strasser. When Strasser was injured in an automobile accident—his car was hit by a freight train—Hitler visited him in his Landshut home, bearing a large bouquet of flowers and expressions of sympathy.

Hitler wooed Goebbels as well. He invited Goebbels to speak, with Hitler on stage, at the Bürgerbräukeller on 8 April 1926, and had the event widely publicized. Hitler's chauffeur, driving the supercharged Mercedes, picked up Goebbels (along with Pfeffer and Kaufmann) at the train station and gave them a tour of Munich. Hitler greeted the trio at their hotel and Goebbels confessed to his diary that "his kindness in spite of Bamberg makes us feel ashamed." After Goebbels' speech at the beer hall, the audience responds wildly and Hitler embraces Goebbels, with "tears in his eyes."

The next day Hitler dressed down Goebbels, Pfeffer and Kaufmann for their rebelliousness but forgave them, and Goebbels wrote in his journal that "unity follows. Hitler is great." Hitler continued his conversations with Goebbels and invited him to dine in Hitler's apartment, accompanied by Geli, who flirted with the young Goebbels, much to his delight. Later, Hitler took Goebbels on day-long sightseeing tours in Bavaria and when Hitler spoke in Stuttgart, Goebbels was on stage with him. At the end of August, Goebbels was offered the prestigious post of Gauleiter of Gau Berlin-Brandenburg, which he accepted in late October 1926. Goebbels would remain one of Hitler's most loyal lieutenants until the end of the regime.

On 1 July 1926, Hitler signed a directive stating that since the NSDAP represented a large working association, there was "no justification" for any smaller working associations in the form of combinations of individual Gaue, rendering the Working Association superfluous. Its formal dissolution was announced by Strasser in the NS-Briefe of 1 October 1926.

== Sources ==
- Browder, George C. (2004). Foundations of the Nazi Police State: The Formation of Sipo and SD. University of Kentucky Press. ISBN 0-8131-9111-4.
- Bullock, Alan (1971). Hitler: A Study in Tyranny. New York: Harper & Row. ISBN 0-06-080216-2.
- Carsten, F. L. (1982). The Rise of Fascism (2nd ed.). New York: University of California Press. ISBN 0-520-04643-9.
- Collier, Martin (2000). Germany 1919-45. Heinemann. ISBN 0-435-32721-6.
- Fest, Joachim C. (2002). Hitler. Houghton Mifflin Harcourt. ISBN 0-15-602754-2.
- Fischer, Conan (2002). The Rise of the Nazis. Manchester University Press. ISBN 0-7190-6067-2.
- Grant, Thomas D. (2004). Stormtroopers and Crisis in the Nazi Movement: Activism, Ideology and Dissolution. Routledge. ISBN 0-415-19602-7.
- Hoffman, Peter (2000). Hitler's Personal Security: Protecting the Führer, 1921-1945. Da Capo Press. ISBN 0-306-80947-8.
- Kershaw, Ian (1999). Hitler 1889–1936: Hubris. New York: W. W. Norton & Company. ISBN 0-393-04671-0.
- Large, David Clay (1999). Where Ghosts Walked: Munich's Road to the Third Reich. New York: W. W. Norton & Company. ISBN 0-393-03836-X.
- Krebs, Albert (1976). The infancy of Nazism: The memoirs of ex-Gauleiter Albert Krebs, 1923-1933. New Viewpoints. ISBN 978-0-531-05376-8.
- Lemmons, Russel (1994). Goebbels and Der Angriff. University of Kentucky Press. ISBN 0-8131-1848-4.
- Longerich, Peter (2015). Goebbels: A Biography. Vintage. ISBN 978-0-099-52369-7.
- Machtan, Lothar (2002). The Hidden Hitler. Basic Books. ISBN 0-465-04309-7.
- Noakes, Jeremy (October 1966). "Conflict and Development in the NSDAP 1924-1927". Journal of Contemporary History. 1 (4). Sage Publications, Ltd.: 19–35. doi:10.1177/002200946600100401.
- Nyomarkay, Joseph (17 July 1967). Charisma and Factionalism in the Nazi Party. University of Minnesota Press. ISBN 0-8166-5839-0.
- Read, Anthony (2004). The Devil's Disciples: Hitler's Inner Circle. W. W. Norton & Company. ISBN 0-393-04800-4.
- Shirer, William L. (1960). The Rise and Fall of the Third Reich. New York: Simon & Schuster. ISBN 978-0-9999452-6-1.
- Stachura, Peter D. (2015). Gregor Strasser and the Rise of Nazism. London: Routledge. ISBN 978-1-138-79862-5.
- Toland, John (1976). Adolf Hitler. Garden City, New York: Doubleday & Company. ISBN 0-385-03724-4.
