= Gau Berlin =

Administrative division of Nazi Germany

- Gau of Nazi Germany
- 1928–1945
- Flag Coat of arms

- Capital: Berlin
- Government
- Gauleiter
  - 1928–1945: Joseph Goebbels
- History
  - Establishment: 1 October 1928
  - Disestablishment: 8 May 1945
Preceded by	Succeeded by
Berlin	Berlin
- Today part of: Germany

The Gau Berlin was an administrative division of Nazi Germany from 1933 to 1945 in the German capital Berlin. Before that, from 1928 to 1933, it was the regional subdivision of the Nazi Party in that area. From 1926 to 1928 Berlin was part of the Gau Berlin-Brandenburg which was split into two separate Gaue on 1 October 1928.

== History ==
The Nazi Gau (plural Gaue) system was originally established in a party conference on 22 May 1926, in order to improve administration of the party structure. From 1933 onwards, after the Nazi seizure of power, the Gaue increasingly replaced the German states as administrative subdivisions in Germany.

At the head of each Gau stood a Gauleiter, a position which became increasingly more powerful, especially after the outbreak of the Second World War, with little interference from above. The local Gauleiters often held government positions as well as party ones and were in charge of, among other things, propaganda and surveillance and, from September 1944 onward, the Volkssturm and the defense of the Gau.

The position of Gauleiter in Berlin was held by Joseph Goebbels throughout the history of the Gau. Goebbels, Reich Minister of Propaganda, was one of Adolf Hitler's closest associates and, along with his family, committed suicide on 1 May 1945.
