= 371st Division =

371st Division may refer to:

- 371st Infantry Division, Wehrmacht, Germany
- 371st Rifle Division, Soviet Union

== See also ==
- List of military divisions by number
- 371st (disambiguation)
