= Wesel Railway Bridge =

Railway bridge in Wesel, Germany

Coordinates: 51.6559°N 6.5944°E

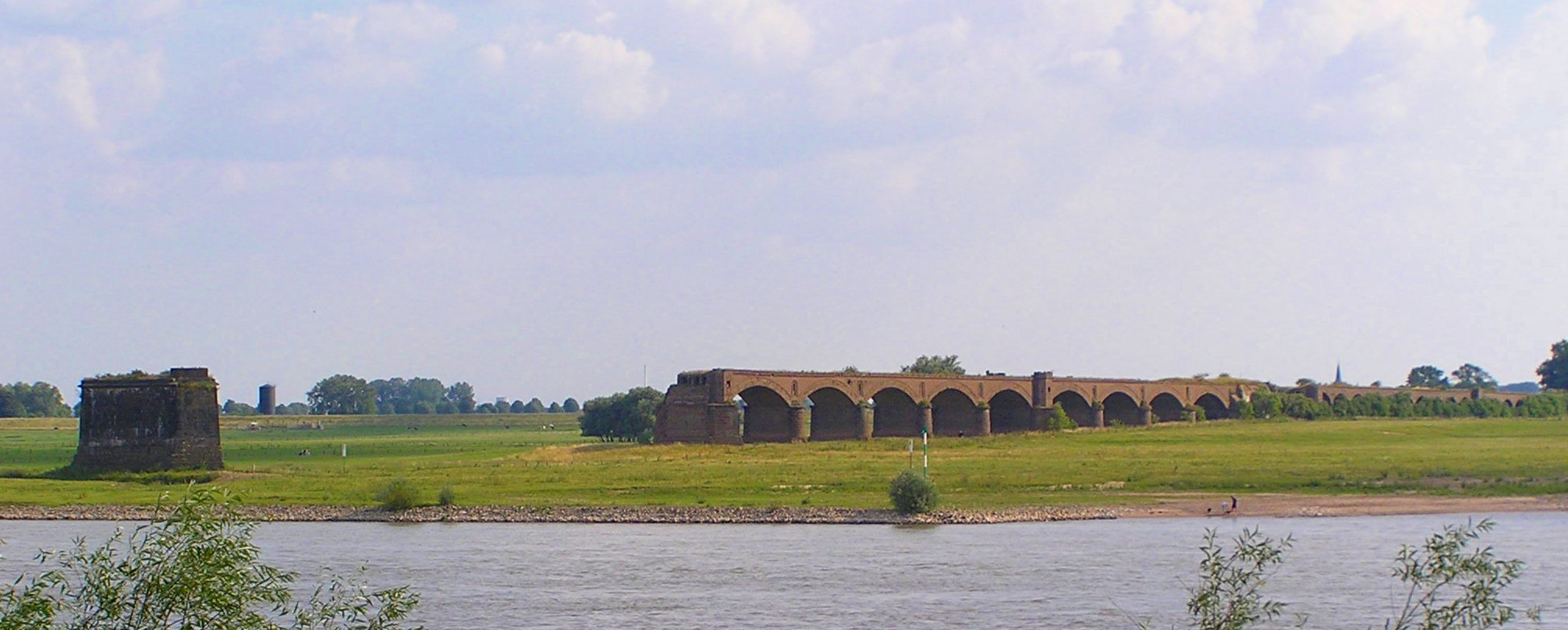
Ruins of the bridge

The Wesel Railway Bridge was a bridge on the Haltern–Venlo railway, built as part of the Hamburg–Venlo railway by the Cologne-Minden Railway Company, and opened on 1 March 1874. The 1,950-metre (6,400 ft) long railway bridge at Wesel was the last Rhine bridge remaining in German hands during World War II.

== World War II ==
=== Destruction and capture ===
From 16 to 19 February 1945 the city of Wesel in Germany was heavily bombed in Allied air raids, and more than 95 percent destroyed. On 10 March 1945 the Rhine and Lippe bridges, among others, were blown up by the Wehrmacht in compliance with Hitler's scorched earth policy that became known as the Nero Decree.

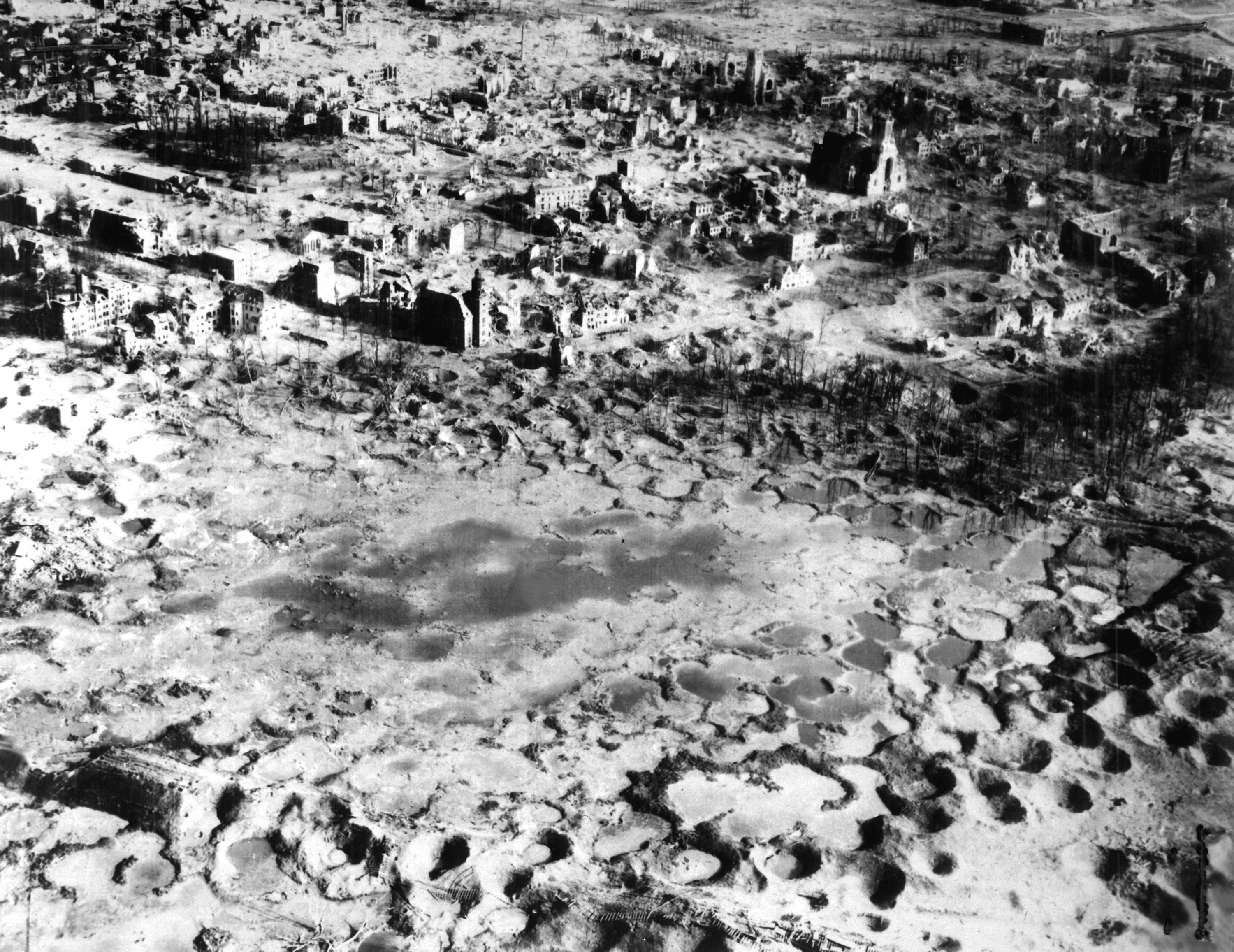
Wesel was almost totally destroyed before it was finally taken by Allied troops

Operation Plunder, tasked with establishing Rhine-crossings at Rees in the north, Xanten in the center, and Wesel in the south, started on 23 March, with four thousand Allied guns firing for four hours during the opening bombardment. The town of Wesel was subsequently taken quickly during the night with only 36 casualties. Field-Marshal Montgomery said of the bombing: "The bombing of Wesel was a masterpiece, and was a decisive factor in making possible our entry into the town before midnight."

=== Bridge reconstruction ===
A large force under Col. James B. Cress was organized for the reconstruction of the bridge, which included the 355th Engineer General Services Regiment commanded by Col. Thomas A. Adcock, elements of the 341st and 1317th Engineer General Services Regiments, with support from the 371st Engineer Construction Battalion, 1056th Port Construction and Repair Group, a dump truck company and an engineer maintenance company. The 371st Engineer Construction Battalion moved by a convoy code named "Boobie Trap" on 29 March 1945, from Geldern to Menzelen, 9 kilometres (5.6 mi) north of Alpen, Germany, preparing to move northeast towards Wesel and the Rhine River rail bridge.

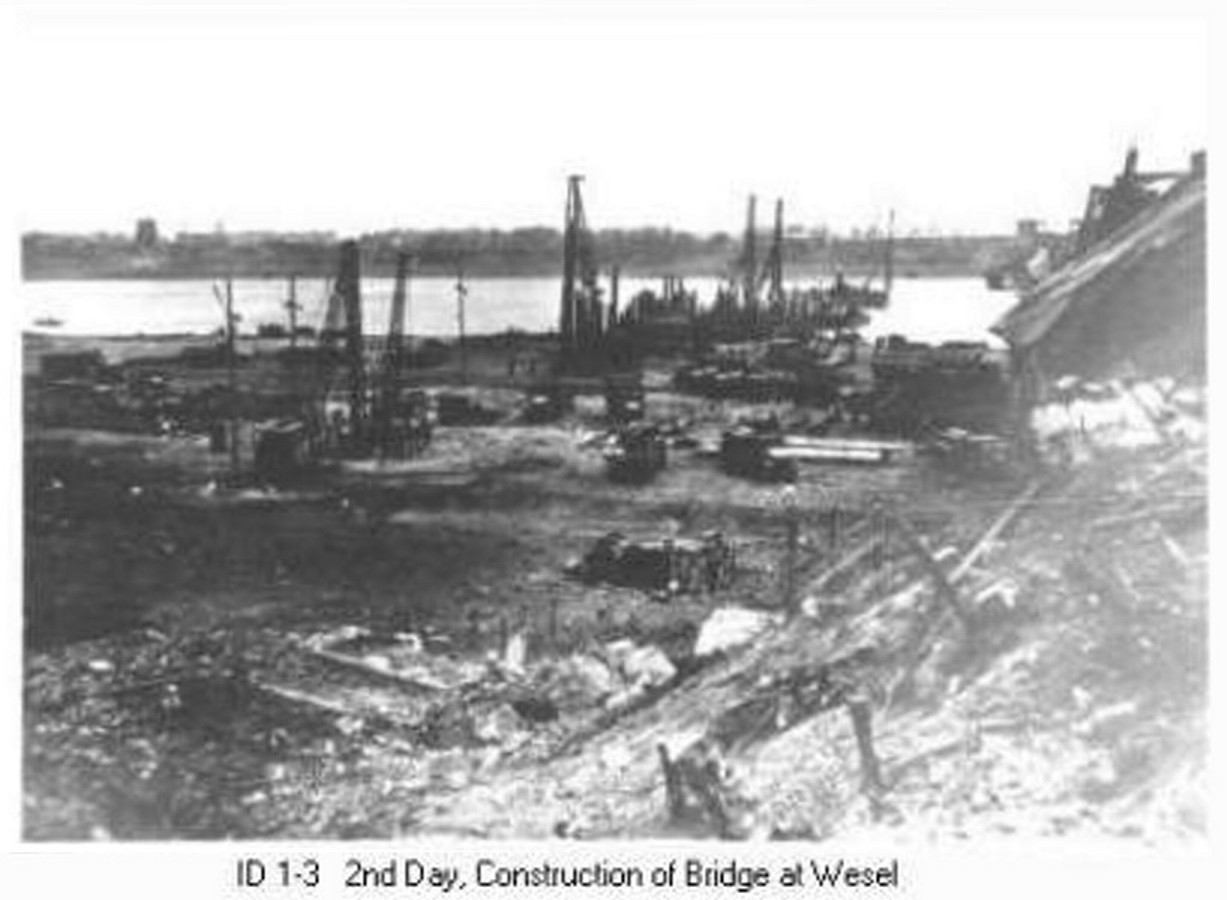
First day of construction of the Wesel Bridge, Wesel, Germany

The Ninth and British 2nd were pushing east at a fast pace, so the engineering companies began working 12-hour shifts of 10 days on, 2 off, on the Rhine River Bridge project. The bridge was a high-level type, approximately 23 metres (75 ft) above high water, and of steel construction to support heavy transport trains.

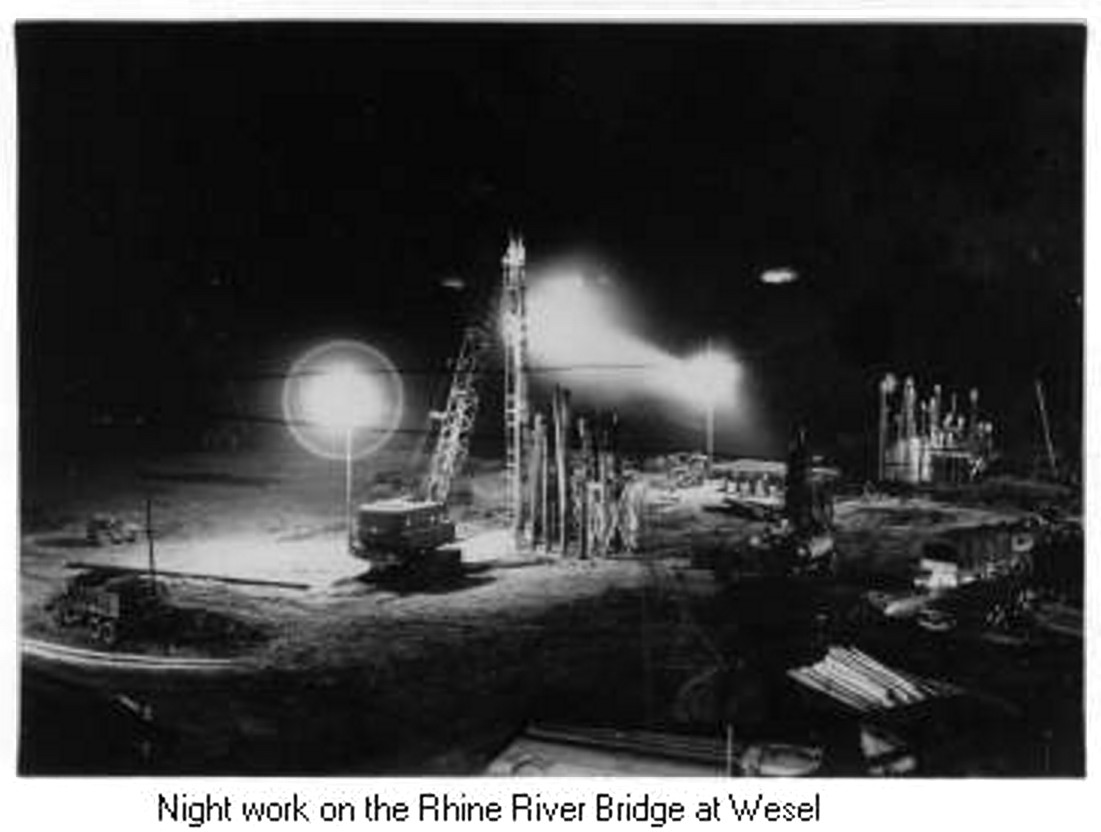
Construction at night

The river depth, between 6 and 11 metres (20 and 36 ft), and 11 km/h (6.8 mph) current made falling into the water a dangerous proposition. Airplanes provided protection along with anti-aircraft gun emplacements and lights on the ground. The Germans were unable to pinpoint the location of the bridge construction project.

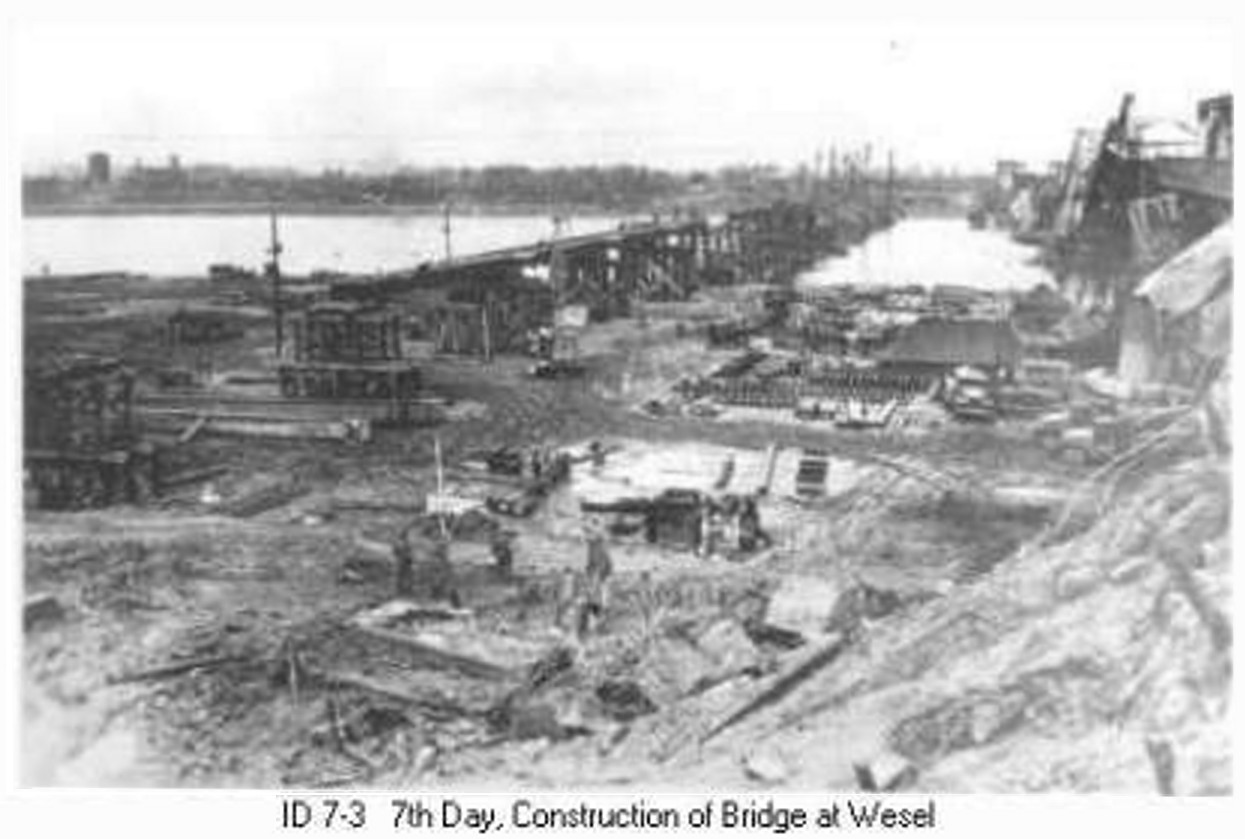
Seventh day of construction of the bridge

On 4 April 1945 the pilings were braced and capped. The 23-metre (75 ft) towers were completed. Steel spans, ties, and track were lowered into place.

=== Completion ===
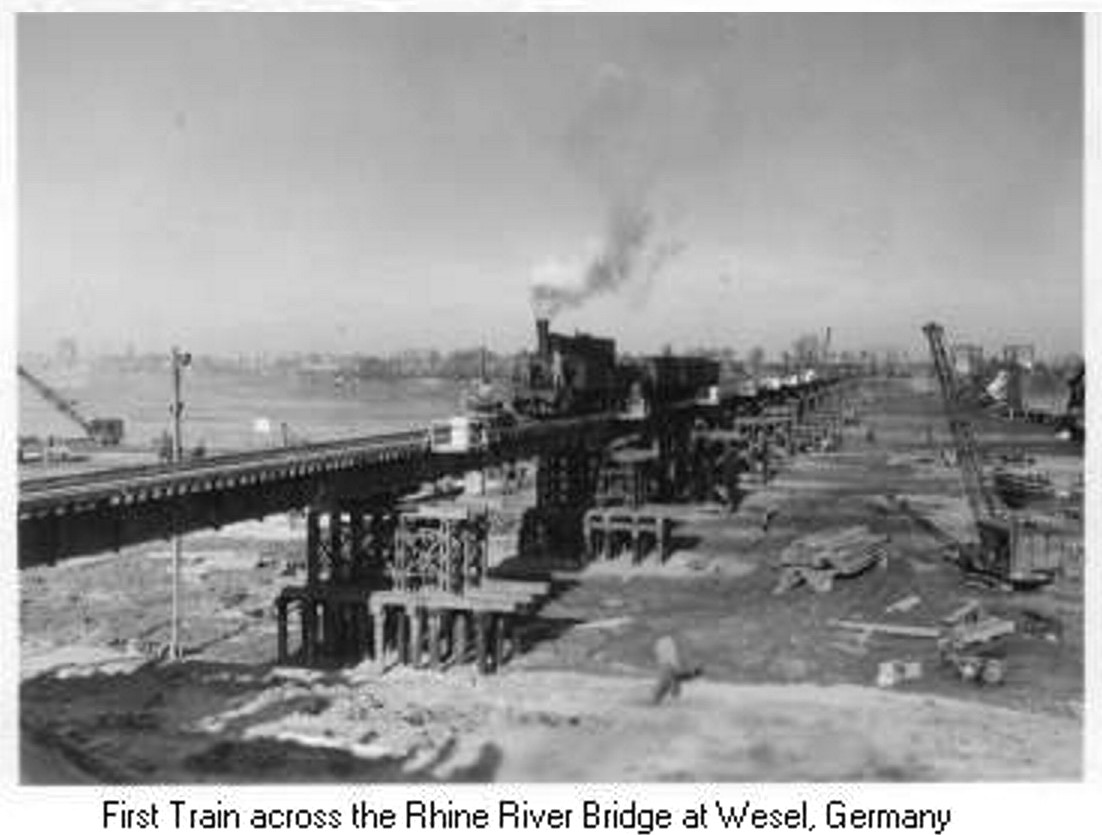
First train to cross the bridge

On 8 April the Rhine River Bridge at Wesel was completed. It was tested by running a train across it that night, and the bridge passed. The following morning, 50 car supply trains began crossing the bridge, keeping to a 8 km/h (5.0 mph) speed limit and traveling one at a time to avoid unnecessary vibration. The Wesel Bridge was the first fixed bridge built by any army engineer to span the Rhine since the days of Caesar, according to military references, and was the first fixed bridge to span the Rhine River with highway bridges included. The "Victory Bridge" constructed by the 332nd Engineer G. S. Regiment wasn't completed until a month later, on 8 May 1945. The railroad bridge at Wesel was named the Robert A. Gouldin Bridge in honor of Major Gouldin of the 355th Engineer G.S. Regiment who lost his life during the construction of the bridge.

Between 8 and 10 April 1945, the 3rd platoon improved the western approach to the bridge, to speed the huge volume of heavy railroad traffic using the single track approach. Other units were tasked with clearing minefields for the landing of aircraft and laying of gas pipelines. One detail was erecting a prefabricated water tower and tank for the Railroad at Büderich Station.

== See also ==
- List of bridges over the Rhine
