= Flensburg Government =

Short-lived government of Nazi Germany

Cabinet of Lutz Graf Schwerin von Krosigk The Flensburg Government
- 3rd Cabinet of Nazi Germany
- 2 May 1945 – 5 June 1945 (de jure); 2 May 1945 – 23 May 1945 (de facto)
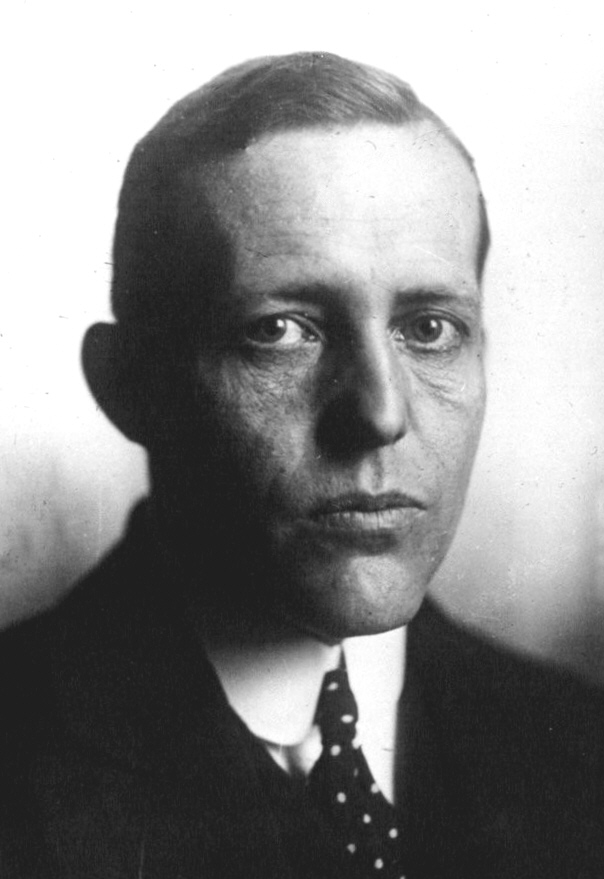
- Lutz Graf Schwerin von Krosigk
- Date formed: 2 May 1945; 81 years ago
- Date dissolved: 23 May 1945; 81 years ago (Note: Although the cabinet of the Government continued to regularly meet in Flensburg until its members were arrested on 23 May 1945, it ceased to effectively function as a government from the time German military forces surrendered to the Allies on 8 May.) (de facto); 5 June 1945; 81 years ago (de jure)

People and organisations
- President of Germany: Karl Dönitz
- Leading Minister of Germany: Lutz Graf Schwerin von Krosigk
- No. of ministers: 7
- Member party: Nazi Party
- Status in legislature: Sole legal party

History
- Incoming formation: Death of Joseph Goebbels
- Outgoing formation: Arrest of the Flensburg Government
- Predecessor: Goebbels cabinet
- Successor: Allied Control Council; First Adenauer cabinet (from 20 September 1949); Council of Ministers of East Germany (from November 1950)

The Flensburg Government (German: Flensburger Regierung), also known as the Flensburg Cabinet (Flensburger Kabinett), the Dönitz Government (Regierung Dönitz), or the Schwerin von Krosigk Cabinet (Kabinett Schwerin von Krosigk), was the rump government of Nazi Germany during a period of three weeks around the end of World War II in Europe. The government was formed following the suicide of Adolf Hitler on 30 April 1945 during the Battle of Berlin. It was headed by Grand Admiral Karl Dönitz as Reichspräsident and Lutz Graf Schwerin von Krosigk as the Leading Minister. The administration was referred to as the "Flensburg Government" due to Dönitz relocating his command to Flensburg, a town situated near the Danish border, on 3 May 1945. The sports school at the Mürwik Naval School was used as the government headquarters. The cabinet was not legitimised according to the Weimar Constitution, which was still formally in force.

At the time of its formation, forces loyal to the Nazi regime still held control of most of Austria and the Sudetenland, which was annexed by Germany in 1938. They also still controlled most of the Protectorate of Bohemia and Moravia, which was partially annexed in 1939 when the remainder of Czechoslovakia was occupied, although after Hitler's death, those Czech lands still occupied were effectively controlled by the SS with little meaningful oversight from Flensburg. Furthermore, the German military continued to occupy other non-German-speaking territories in disparate and isolated locations across Europe, such as Denmark, Norway, parts of the Netherlands, the Atlantic pockets in France and the British Channel Islands. However, in addition to losing most of its wartime conquests by this point, German forces had already been driven out of the vast majority of Germany's post-Anschluss territory, in addition to Luxembourg as well as the Polish and French territories Germany had either annexed or placed under direct German administration in the early stages of the war.

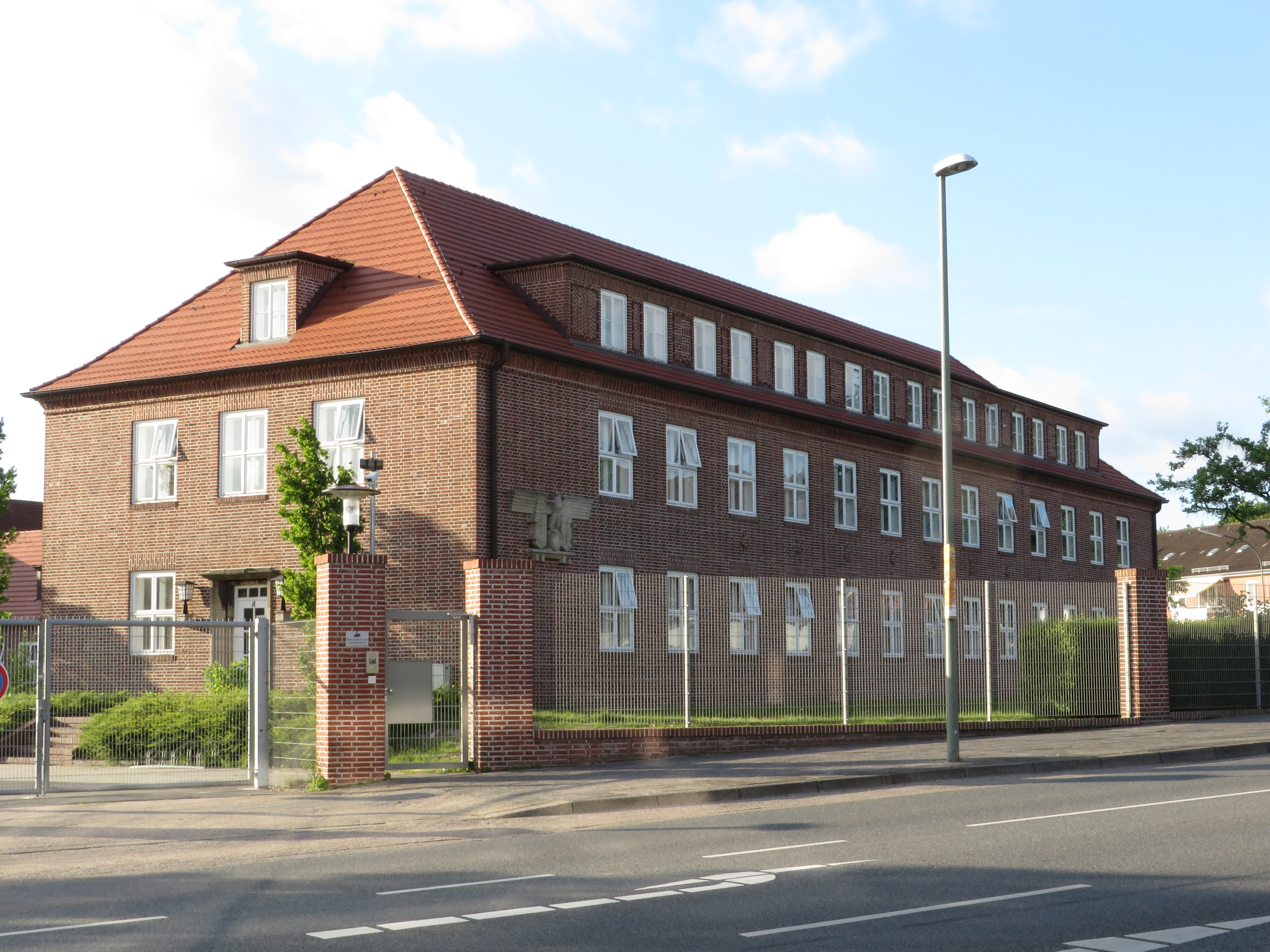
The Mürwik Naval School's sports building and former seat of the Flensburg Government. While the Nazi-era Reichsadler remains, the swastika was removed during the denazification process.

Due to the rapid Allied advance, the Flensburg government's nominal civil jurisdiction at its formation was essentially limited to those parts of Austria and the Sudetenland its forces still controlled, as well as a narrow wedge of German territory running from the pre-1938 Austrian and Czechoslovak borders through Berlin to the Danish border. From 25 April 1945, these lands were cut in two by the American advance to join with Soviet forces at Torgau on the Elbe.

Upon the capitulation of all German forces on 8 May, the administration headed by Dönitz and Krosigk ceased to meaningfully function as a national government. For about two weeks after the surrender, it was, for most practical purposes, ignored by the Western Allies as well as neutral states and the Empire of Japan. In the absence of direct military intervention within Flensburg itself, the ministry there continued to regularly meet and conduct what business it could. Finally, due to factors including pressure from the Soviet Union, on 23 May British troops arrested the entire cabinet as prisoners of war and thus effectively dissolved the last surviving legal remnants of the Nazi regime. This dissolution was formalised on 5 June 1945 by the four Allied Powers, who at that time formed the Allied Control Council to co-ordinate the civil administration of Allied-occupied Germany.

== Formation ==
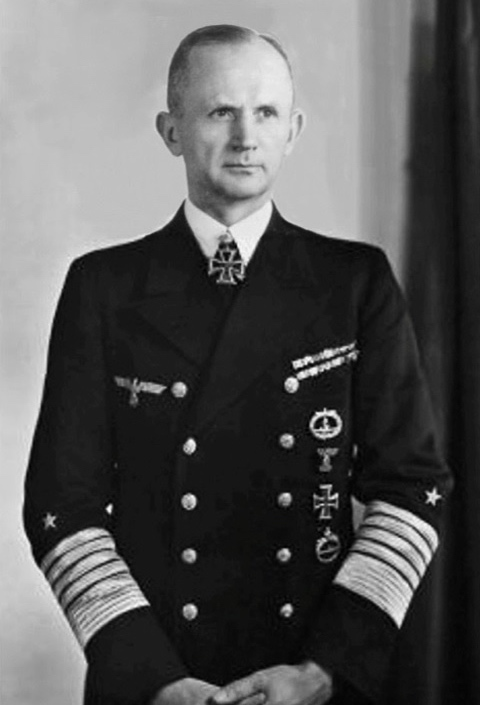
Karl Dönitz

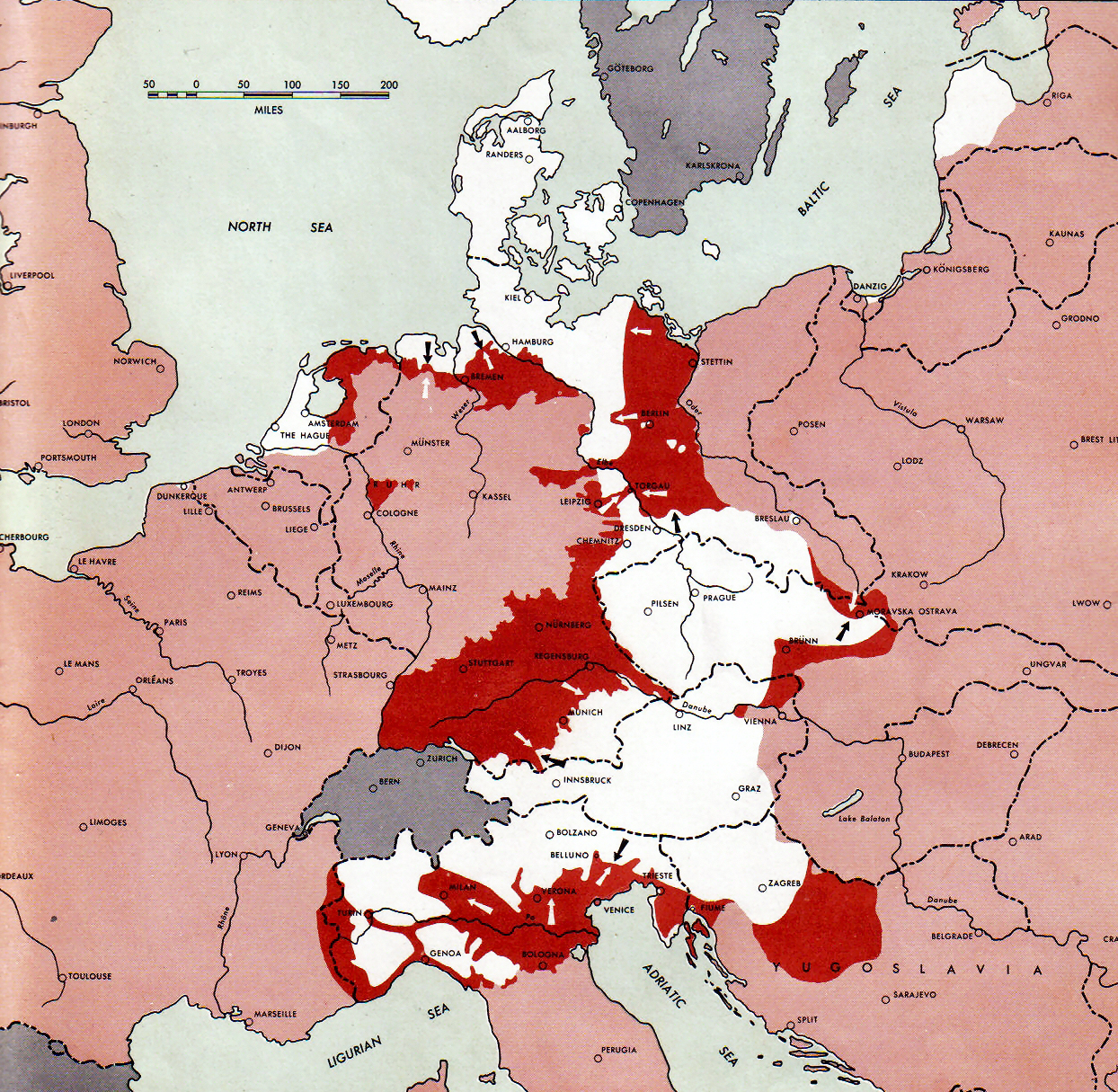
Situation of World War II in Europe at the time of Adolf Hitler's death. The white areas are controlled by German forces, the pink areas are controlled by the Allies, and the red areas indicate recent Allied advances.

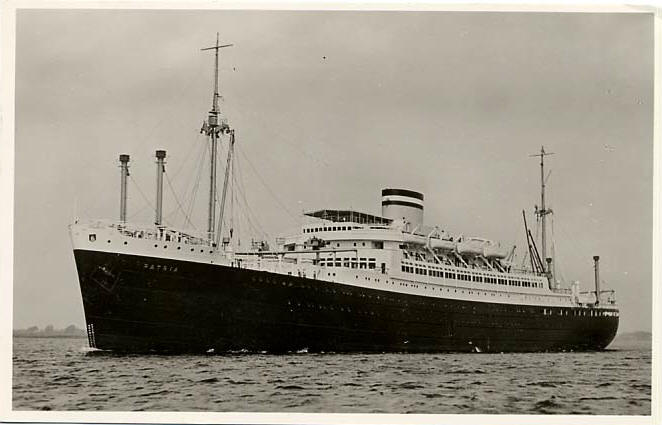
MV Patria in 1939. From 1941, the ship was moored in Flensburg harbour and used as a barracks ship. In May 1945, it was taken over by the Flensburg government.

Once it became apparent that Hitler intended to stay and die in the besieged city of Berlin, effective overall command of German armed forces was exercised through the Oberkommando der Wehrmacht (OKW), the German Military High Command, which had relocated to Rheinsberg. Anticipating that German-held territory would be split, separate military and civilian commands had provisionally been established on 15 April; under Field Marshal Albert Kesselring at Pullach for forces in the south and west, and under Grand Admiral Karl Dönitz at Plön for forces in the north and east; but then Hitler had stalled on transferring executive military authority to them.

On 27 April Wilhelm Keitel and Alfred Jodl, of the Army High Command, met at Rheinsberg with Dönitz and Heinrich Himmler to discuss the war situation now that the fall of Berlin could not be averted. Himmler took the chair as the acknowledged deputy Führer and, since the disgrace and dismissal of Hermann Göring, Hitler's expected successor. As they were leaving Rheinsberg on 28 April, Himmler asked Dönitz to confirm that he would be willing to serve in a successor government that Himmler might form. That day, however, the British and Americans published Himmler's secret proposals for a separate peace in the West (which they had rejected), to which Hitler reacted by dismissing Himmler from all posts and ordering his arrest for treason. Telegrams sent by Martin Bormann on 29 and 30 April informed Dönitz of these developments and of Dönitz's own appointment as Hitler's successor.

With both Göring and Himmler removed from the succession, Hitler, in his political testament, had named Dönitz his successor as President and Supreme Commander of the Armed Forces, and designated Propaganda Minister Joseph Goebbels head of government as Chancellor. Appointing Dönitz as president had no legal basis, even under Nazi law. The chancellor was an appointed official, but the president was elected. Although the Enabling Act of 1933 gave Hitler the right to pass laws that were contrary to the Weimar Constitution, its Article 2 stated explicitly that the president's powers were to remain "undisturbed", which has long been interpreted to forbid any attempt to tamper with the presidency. After the death of president Paul von Hindenburg in 1934, Hitler appropriated the president's powers for himself in accordance with a Law Concerning the Head of State of the German Reich passed the previous day. However, in 1932 the constitution was amended to make the president of the Reichsgericht (High Court of Justice), not the chancellor, acting president pending new elections. (This position was vacant due to the suicide of Erwin Bumke on April 20.) Nonetheless, the Enabling Act did not specify any recourse that could be taken if the chancellor violated Article 2, and no legal challenge was ever mounted. Goebbels committed suicide in the Führerbunker on 1 May. The same day, Dönitz accepted the offices of Supreme Commander and Head of State in separate broadcast addresses to the German armed forces and to the German people. Residual ministers of the Hitler cabinet, who had fled from the fall of Berlin to join Dönitz at the Wehrmacht barracks near Plön in Holstein, resigned the next day. Suspecting that Bormann might also have escaped from Berlin and be intending to seize power, Dönitz met with Hitler's former Finance Minister Lutz Graf Schwerin von Krosigk and asked him to constitute a new Reich government.

Schwerin von Krosigk's cabinet first met in Eutin, to which he and his ministerial staff were evacuated, on 2 May. Later on 2 May, and in view of the rapidly advancing British Second Army which was approaching Lübeck, Dönitz met Schwerin von Krosigk, Paul Wegener, Himmler, and Keitel to discuss the urgent necessity of a further relocation. Himmler argued for a move to Prague, then the last major central European capital city in German hands, and closer to advancing American forces with whom he hoped to negotiate personally, but Dönitz refused to sanction any move outside the borders of Germany. Moreover, the political situation of the Protectorate of Bohemia and Moravia was highly unstable. Dönitz decided instead to proceed to the Mürwik naval academy in Flensburg near the Danish border. The cabinet met in the sports school of the naval academy; while administrative offices and accommodation for the various ministries were established on the liner Patria, moored in Flensburg harbour. The German High Command, which moved from Rheinsberg to Neustadt in Holstein two days before, then also relocated to Flensburg, while the SS leadership had been gathering at Flensburg since 28 April.

== Cabinet ==
On May 2, Dönitz commissioned Schwerin von Krosigk to form a new Cabinet. This was to be a caretaker and non-political Reich government (geschäftsführende Reichsregierung). Von Krosigk was appointed Leading Minister, remained Minister of Finance, and on that day also replaced Arthur Seyss-Inquart as Minister for Foreign Affairs.

Meanwhile, according to the Reichsministergesetz of 1930, the ministers of the Goebbels cabinet formally remained in office until they were replaced by a new minister, explicitly removed from office by the Reichspräsident, or voluntarily resigned.

On May 3, Dönitz appointed Wilhelm Stuckart as Minister of the Interior and Minister of Culture, replacing Paul Giesler and Gustav Adolf Scheel.

The new Reich government was presented on 5 May 1945. Julius Dorpmüller, after being omitted from the Goebbels cabinet, was again appointed Minister of Transport and also Minister for Communications and Posts. Herbert Backe remained Minister for Food and Agriculture. Albert Speer replaced Walther Funk as Minister of Economics, Franz Seldte replaced Theo Hupfauer as Minister for Labor, and Herbert Klemm replaced Otto Georg Thierack as Minister of Justice.

Three ministries were abolished (Air Ministry, Occupied Eastern Territories and Public Enlightenment and Propaganda). The ministries for Armaments and War Production and Church Affairs no longer played a role.

Portfolio	Minister	Took office	Left office	Party
Reichspräsident and Minister of War	Karl Dönitz	30 April 1945	23 May 1945 (Note: Dönitz and all members of the government were arrested on 23 May and, therefore, de facto "left office". They were replaced de jure by the Allied Control Council established by the Berlin Declaration of 5 June.)	NSDAP
"Leading Minister" and; Minister for Foreign Affairs	Lutz Graf Schwerin von Krosigk	2 May 1945	23 May 1945	NSDAP
Minister of Finance	Lutz Graf Schwerin von Krosigk	1 June 1932	23 May 1945	NSDAP
Minister of Transport	Julius Dorpmüller	5 May 1945	23 May 1945	NSDAP
Minister for Food, Agriculture and Forests	Herbert Backe	23 May 1942	23 May 1945	NSDAP
Minister of Industry and Production	Albert Speer	5 May 1945	23 May 1945	NSDAP
Minister for Labor and Social Affairs	Franz Seldte	5 May 1945	23 May 1945	NSDAP
Minister of the Interior	Wilhelm Stuckart	3 May 1945	23 May 1945	NSDAP
Minister of Culture	Wilhelm Stuckart	3 May 1945	23 May 1945	NSDAP
Minister of Justice	Herbert Klemm	5 May 1945	23 May 1945	NSDAP
Minister for Communications and Posts	Julius Dorpmüller	5 May 1945	23 May 1945	NSDAP

Dönitz avoided including prominent Nazi leaders in his cabinet other than Speer, but included several serving officers in the SS and others who were closely involved in formulating and prosecuting the genocidal policies of the former regime. Herbert Backe was the author of the Hunger Plan of 1941, a deliberate strategy for mass elimination by starvation of Soviet prisoners of war and "surplus" Soviet urban populations. Speer's deputy in the Economics and Production Ministry was Otto Ohlendorf, who had personally directed the murder of hundreds of thousands of Jews and Communists in occupied Soviet territory. Wilhelm Stuckart was a participant at the Wannsee Conference of January 1942, when the administrative responsibilities for the "Final Solution to the Jewish Problem" were agreed upon. Otto Ohlendorf had transferred across directly from directing Himmler's office as Reichsführer-SS; and overall, of 350 staff working in the offices of the Flensburg government, 230 had been members of the SS or other security services. Dönitz's cabinet picks were clearly circumscribed by who was available. Otherwise, and in spite of his subsequent claim that his government was "unpolitical", the most consistent characteristic of those chosen was a virulent opposition to Bolshevism, and a determination to ensure that the revolutionary events in Germany attending the Armistice of 1918 would not be repeated in 1945. As Dönitz did not then intend any surrender to the Soviets or Poles and continued to identify "Jews and profiteers" as enemies of the German people, he had little compunction over including in his cabinet men who had participated in the killing of Slavs and Jews.

Heinrich Himmler had been condemned as a traitor, dismissed from all functions and ordered to be arrested in Hitler's political testament. Dönitz did not want Himmler's name associated with his new government. However, Dönitz feared that any move against Himmler would alienate the SS, a force that was personally loyal to its commanding officer. Following Hitler's suicide, the SS remained armed, powerful, and skeptical of the Führer's allegations against Himmler. A further complication to Dönitz's authority to replace Himmler was that Hitler's aforementioned testament had explicitly named a successor to Himmler, Paul Giesler, (Note: Paul Giesler committed suicide on 8 May 1945.) whom Dönitz detested at least as much as Himmler. Dönitz tacitly set Hitler's instructions aside and continued to see Himmler on a daily basis without according him any formal appointment. It was only on 6 May 1945, while final negotiations were in prospect for a capitulation to US General Dwight D. Eisenhower in the west, that Dönitz dismissed Himmler from all his posts.

== Armed Forces High Command ==
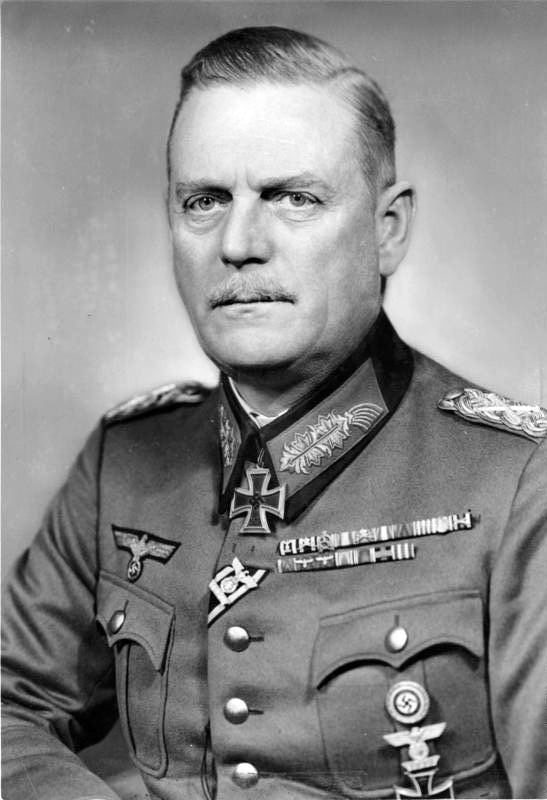
Wilhelm Keitel

Dönitz had hoped to be able to appoint Field Marshal Erich von Manstein as Commander in Chief of the Army (Oberkommando des Heeres) and Chief of the OKW (Oberkommando der Wehrmacht), but he could not be contacted on 2 May, and so Field Marshal Wilhelm Keitel was kept in the post; and in this capacity Keitel signed the act of surrender for the German High Command in Berlin on 8 May. A further factor favouring the continuation of Keitel as Commander in Chief was the support for him of General Alfred Jodl, the Chief of Operations Staff of the Wehrmacht, whose retention Dönitz recognised as essential. Jodl was to represent Dönitz in negotiations with the Allies in Reims, France. On 13 May, Keitel was arrested at the request of the United States and interned at Camp Ashcan in Mondorf-les-Bains. Jodl succeeded him as Chief of OKW until the termination of the Flensburg Government on 23 May.

Ferdinand Schörner, who was named in Hitler's last will and testament as the new Commander of the OKH, did not have any discernible influence in the final days of the Reich. The last the OKW had heard from Schörner was on 2 May. He remained the nominal Commander of the OKH until the end of the war on 8 May. Schörner deserted and flew to Austria, where he was arrested by the Americans on 18 May.

Admiral Hans-Georg von Friedeburg was appointed to succeed Dönitz as Commander of the Kriegsmarine and was promoted by Dönitz to the rank of Generaladmiral on 1 May. The Air Force had largely been destroyed or grounded due to a lack of fuel, so no new appointment was made. Field Marshal Robert Ritter von Greim remained as Commander of the Luftwaffe.

In spite of its repeated relocations, the Armed Forces High Command continued to function, its organisation and structures having been maintained. But the same was not true of any other arm of government. Starting in March 1945, the staff of the various ministries were evacuated to resort hotels in the Bavarian and Austrian Alps – chiefly in the region of Berchtesgaden, leaving only the ministers themselves in Berlin. On 13 April, the remaining foreign embassies and the diplomatic corps were evacuated to Bad Gastein. Finally, on 20 April, all the ministers and their personal staff were ordered to make their way southwards; but as by then the roads had been cut and there were insufficient transport aircraft available, several ministers (like Schwerin von Krosigk) had perforce headed north instead. Thus, the government of Germany was, at the death of Hitler, split into six centres. The Propaganda Ministry, the personal fiefdom of Joseph Goebbels, had remained with him in Berlin, as had the Nazi Party Chancellery under Martin Bormann; while the Luftwaffe High Command had relocated to Berchtesgaden, having been until his abrupt dismissal on 23 April the counterpart fiefdom of Göring. Himmler had retained his personal power base in the offices of the SS and security apparatus, which was established in Lübeck in the north and then relocated to Flensburg. Other government ministries and ministers were then variously located at Berchtesgaden and Dönitz's headquarters in Plön. With the Armed Forces High Command also located in the north – although many OKW personnel had gone south – there was, in consequence, no semblance any longer of a German central government, and most of the members of the cabinet lacked any support staff from their nominal ministries.

== Actions ==
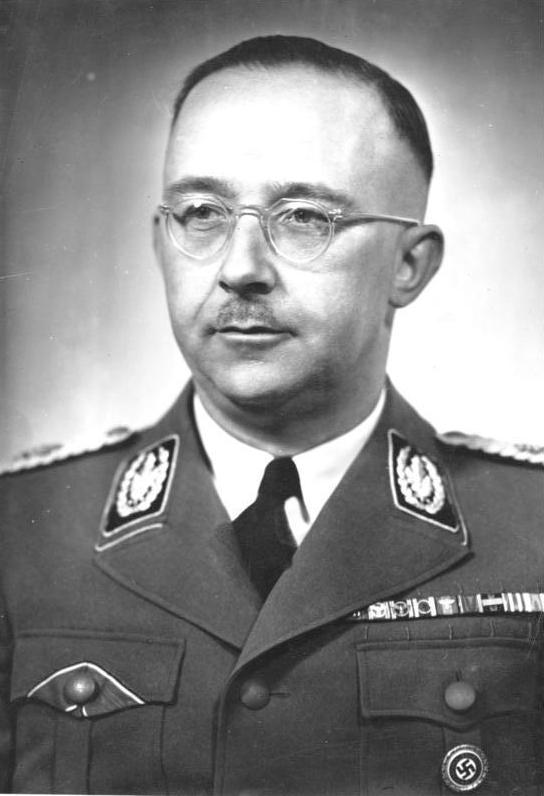
Heinrich Himmler

Dönitz's initial priority was to open communication with the commanders of German armies and to establish with them their acknowledgement of his new authority as the sole Supreme Commander of all German forces. He also sought their agreement with his overall policy of negotiating successive partial surrenders with the Western Allies, while maintaining the war against Soviet forces in the east. Key to this was sidelining Himmler, Joachim von Ribbentrop, Alfred Rosenberg, and other former Nazi grandees who had fled to Flensburg, but whose continued participation in government would preclude any negotiation with the western Allies. Dönitz's intentions in this were, if possible, to split the Allies and to offer German military units as components of a common anti-Bolshevik front. Failing that, he sought to save as many German soldiers as possible from Soviet captivity by ordering units in the east to retreat westwards and surrender to the British, Canadians, or Americans and by redoubling Operation Hannibal, the maritime evacuation of units trapped on the Baltic coast. At Dönitz's urging, Keitel and Jodl attempted to direct what was left of the Wehrmacht towards these goals. On 2 May, Dönitz obtained pledges of allegiance from the commanders of German armies in Norway, Courland, East Prussia, and Bohemia; these pledges were made to him personally as Supreme Commander, and not as Head of State in a forthcoming government.

Otherwise, however, Dönitz's policies chiefly demonstrated continuity with the previous regime: the Nazi party was neither banned nor dissolved; Dönitz kept a bust of Hitler in his office; and the uniforms, insignia, and protocol of Nazi Germany were maintained, initially including even the 'Heil Hitler' greeting. Following a plea from Speer, on 2 May Dönitz rescinded the infamous "Nero Decree" ordering scorched earth destruction of German infrastructure and industrial plants; but it was not until 6 May that counterpart destruction orders were rescinded for those territories remaining under German occupation, such as Norway. Moreover, neither summary courts for civil punishment nor military discipline by summary courts martial were abolished, with military executions for insulting the memory of Hitler being confirmed even after the final capitulation on 8 May.

While the presence of SS leaders and their staff in Flensburg had provided Dönitz with a source of personnel to support his government, they otherwise presented problems. In particular, the SS leadership had access to armed forces that were not under Dönitz's control, and remained firmly loyal to Himmler, whom Dönitz had surmised was personally unacceptable now to both the Western Allies and to the Wehrmacht. Dönitz handled the issue by stringing Himmler along for as long as he could with vague prospects of a possible function in the government. Once serious negotiations were underway for surrender to Eisenhower, Himmler and the SS apparatus had to be got out of the way. On 5 May 1945, Dönitz informed Himmler of his forthcoming dismissal, promising false papers and identities for him and his leading lieutenants if they removed themselves promptly. Himmler called his fellow SS leaders together for a last time that day, and advised them to "dive down within the Wehrmacht". By the next day, they had fled.

This came too late for the concentration camp prisoners within the area who were now within Dönitz's nominal authority, while under the actual control of the SS. These numbered around 10,000 when Dönitz assumed the presidency; mainly former inmates of the Neuengamme concentration camp outside Hamburg, which had been shut down in preparation for the surrender of the city to the British. Between 16 and 28 April, the prisoners were moved eastwards and concealed by the SS in a flotilla of unseaworthy ships anchored in the Bay of Lübeck, where they then remained without food or medical attention. At the time, this action was opposed by Rear Admiral Conrad Engelhardt on Dönitz's staff, but when the Flensburg government came into being, Dönitz made no attempt to free the prisoners, and his government avoided any subsequent acknowledgement that they had known they were there. On 3 May 1945, the prison flotilla was sunk by the Royal Air Force in the mistaken belief that the ships were being prepared to evacuate leading SS personnel. Over 7,000 prisoners drowned, mainly on the former liner Cap Arcona.

=== Partial capitulations in the West ===
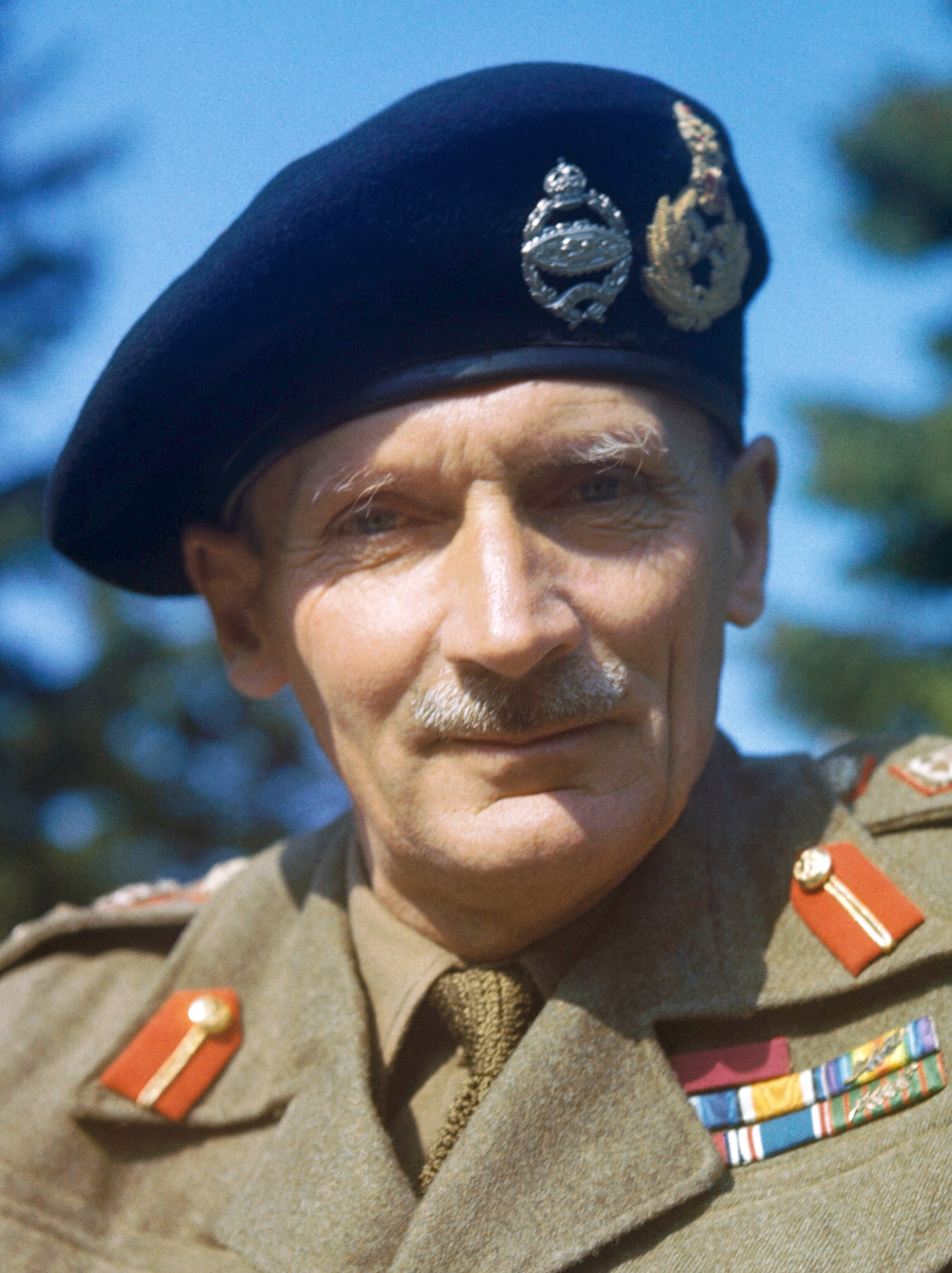
Field Marshal Bernard Montgomery

On 2 May, while still at Plön, Dönitz was surprised to learn that German forces in Italy had surrendered unconditionally to the Western Allies. The capitulation was negotiated without Hitler's knowledge or consent, and signed at Caserta on 29 April, but it did not come into effect for three days. While Hitler was still alive, Dönitz followed his commands absolutely to fight on to the last on all fronts. However, he now realised that the Wehrmacht's position in the West was untenable. He believed that surrendering German forces only to the Western Allies could present opportunities to split the British and Americans from the Soviets. Thereon, he assumed direction of further German surrender initiatives, exploring opportunities for partial surrender in the West. In the East, however, he continued to order German armies to fight on. On 2 May, he tried unsuccessfully to countermand the decisions of the German commander in Berlin to surrender their forces to the Soviets; and on 3 May, issued orders to the besieged defenders of Courland and Breslau to maintain their resistance.

On 3 May, Dönitz sent Admiral Hans-Georg von Friedeburg, his successor as naval commander in chief, to the headquarters of British Field Marshal Bernard Montgomery at Lüneburg, with an offer to surrender the German forces in northwest Germany, together with the remaining elements of Army Group Vistula. Montgomery informed Friedeburg that he could not accept the surrender of forces fighting on the Eastern Front and that, consequently, Army Group Vistula would have to surrender to the Soviets, although British forces would accept the surrender of any German soldiers fleeing westwards. He proposed instead, following discussions between Eisenhower and the British government, that he would accept the surrender of all German military forces in Northwestern Germany, Schleswig-Holstein, the Netherlands, and Denmark, including naval forces and warships in those areas. Friedeburg asked for 48 hours to consider this; Montgomery allowed him 24. The proposed inclusion of Denmark, and the German warships operating there, initially alarmed Dönitz, who wished at all costs to maintain Operation Hannibal, evacuating German troops across the Baltic to Danish ports; but on consideration, he reckoned he might secretly evade the obligation to surrender these ships if they were at sea on the date the surrender came into effect. Furthermore, as it was unlikely that Montgomery would promptly be able to deploy British forces to the Danish islands under German occupation, especially Bornholm in the central Baltic, there was every possibility that the evacuation proceeding there could continue in total disregard of the agreed surrender terms. Consequently, authorised by Dönitz, Friedeburg returned on 4 May and signed an instrument of surrender for all German troops and ships in the Netherlands, Denmark, and Northwestern Germany. This was accepted by Montgomery on behalf of Eisenhower. This 4 May surrender would become effective at 8:00 am on 5 May; so Dönitz ordered all ships involved in Operation Hannibal to undertake a covert final evacuation voyage, while also unilaterally ordering all U-boat actions to cease. One crew in the evacuation fleet refused to set sail; so Dönitz ordered the ringleaders to be arrested for mutiny, tried by summary court martial, and shot.

Also, on 5 May 1945, all German forces in Bavaria and South West Germany signed an act of surrender to the Americans at Haar, outside Munich, coming into effect on 6 May. Montgomery, always seeking to boost his own public standing at the expense of other Allied commanders, had arranged extensive media coverage of the 4 May signing. Montgomery had supplied Friedeburg with a prepared German text of the surrender documents; however, because both this and the English text had explicitly stated that only the English version was to be considered authentic, Montgomery apparently deemed it unnecessary to issue the German text to the press. Dönitz and Krosigk quickly realised this oversight and promptly broadcast their own, doctored, German version, which differed significantly from that signed - specifically, the warships in the Baltic were not included, nor was the territory in Schleswig around Flensburg itself; and especially, the surrender was described as a "truce", not a capitulation. As was Dönitz's intention, this broadcast exacerbated Joseph Stalin's suspicions of the partial capitulations, especially as the greater parts of the 3rd Panzer Army and 21st Army had indeed been able to surrender to the British and Americans, rather than the Soviets. Realising this, Eisenhower determined that no further partial capitulations would be negotiated.

The capitulations at Lüneburg and Haar could do nothing, however, for the bulk of the German forces in Army Group Centre, fighting the Soviets in Bohemia and Saxony. On 4 May, Dönitz, together with Karl Frank, the Reich Protector of Bohemia and Moravia, conceived of a device whereby Army Group Centre might be able to surrender to General George S. Patton's American forces, who had been entering the Sudetenland areas of former Czechoslovakia from the west, and approaching Plzeň. Dönitz proposed that Frank should dissolve the Protectorate of Bohemia and Moravia and resign in favour of a puppet Czech government, which would then declare Prague an open city and invite the Americans in. Patton's virulent anti-communist views were well known to the German leadership, who reckoned that with Patton in Prague, it would become much easier for Army Group Centre to negotiate surrender terms with him while maintaining their resistance to the Soviets, if possible, dragging the US and Soviet armies into direct confrontation. The ploy was proposed as being put into effect on 5 May, but was overtaken by the outbreak of the Prague uprising on that date; and over the succeeding three days, far from surrendering Prague as an open city, SS forces launched a savage response to the insurgents, with brutal reprisals against Czech civilians and widespread destruction in central Prague. Orders to fire-bomb the whole of the Old Town were only averted due to lack of fuel for Luftwaffe bombing units. Alerted to the German machinations through intercepted Ultra signals, Eisenhower ordered Patton to stand still in Plzeň in spite of ever more desperate calls for help from the insurgents. Prague was finally relieved by Soviet Marshal Ivan Konev's forces on 9 May 1945.

=== General capitulation on all fronts ===
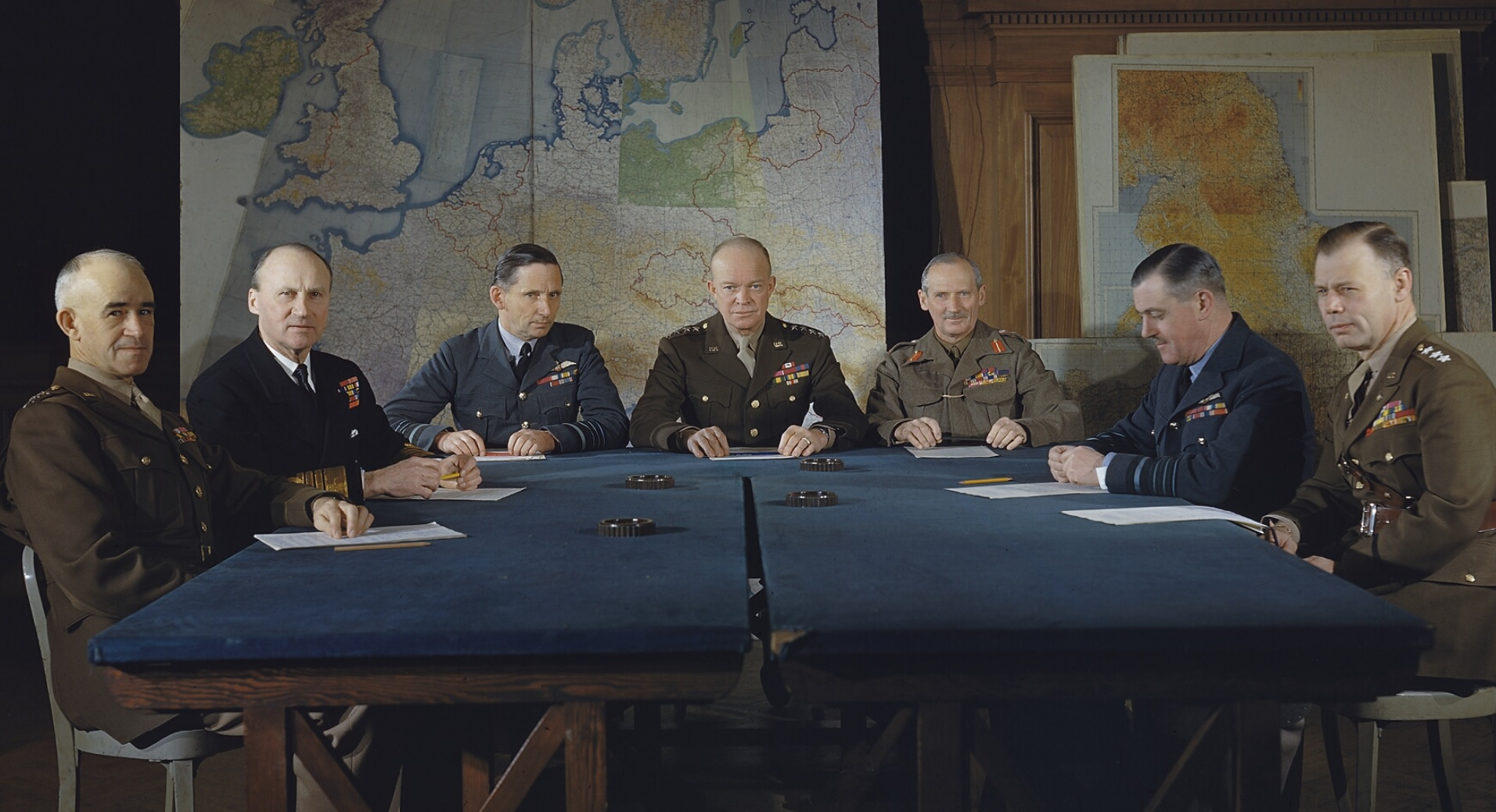
SHAEF commanders at a conference in London

Following the success of the two partial surrenders of 4 and 5 May, Dönitz instructed Friedeburg to go to the Supreme Headquarters of the Allied Expeditionary Force (SHAEF) to negotiate with Eisenhower terms for a general surrender of all remaining German armies to the Western Allies. Since Friedeburg's meeting with Montgomery, Eisenhower's opposition to accepting a German surrender that excluded the Soviet Union was made clear to the German High Command, but Dönitz hoped to change his mind.

On the next day, 5 May, Friedeburg arrived at General Eisenhower's headquarters at Reims, France, but learned that Eisenhower was resolute that only a total surrender on all fronts to all the Allies could be discussed. Jodl arrived a day later, ostensibly to sign such a general surrender. Dönitz had instructed him to draw out the negotiations for as long as possible so that German troops and refugees could move west to surrender to the Western Powers. Eisenhower made it clear that the Allies demanded immediate unconditional surrender on all fronts. When it became obvious that the Germans were stalling, Eisenhower threatened to close the western front to all surrendering Germans from the east. Had this happened, German soldiers attempting to cross the line to surrender would be fired on and all subsequent surrenders would have to be to the Soviets. When Dönitz learned this, he radioed Jodl full powers to sign the unconditional German Instrument of Surrender at 01:30 am on the morning of 7 May. Just over an hour later, Jodl signed the documents. The surrender documents included the phrase, "The German High Command will at once issue orders to all German military, naval and air authorities and to all forces under German control to cease active operations at 23:01 hours Central European time on 8 May and to remain in the positions occupied at that time." The Western Allies had a unified command structure and formed a single expeditionary force, the "Allied Expeditionary Force". US Army General Walter Bedell Smith (Eisenhower's chief of staff at SHAEF) signed on behalf of the Western Allies, and General Ivan Susloparov (the Soviet liaison officer at SHAEF) signed on behalf of the Soviets. French Major General François Sevez signed as the official witness.

Although Eisenhower had sought to keep General Aleksei Antonov of the Soviet High Command fully informed of the progress of the surrender negotiations, no confirmation was received from the Soviets that the text of the Act of Military Surrender was acceptable to them, or that Susloparov was empowered to sign it. Accordingly, Eisenhower extracted from Jodl an additional signed undertaking that the Chief of the OKW and the Commanders in Chief of all three German armed services would attend in person and sign a "formal ratification" of the Act of Military Surrender, at a place and date to be specified. Some six hours after the signing, a response came from Antonov that the terms of surrender were unacceptable and that Susloparov could not sign it. Eisenhower promptly agreed and undertook to attend together with the rest of the SHAEF for the definitive signing in Berlin two days later. Antonov's response also noted that Friedeburg was referring matters back to Dönitz over the radio, and that Dönitz, in direct breach of the signed surrender terms, had still not issued orders for German forces in the east to remain in their positions, but was instead instructing them to continue their resistance and flee westwards. Antonov stated that, while the internal discussions of the German military in no way obligated the Allied Powers, Jodl's signature could not be accepted as valid if he was signing as Dönitz's representative, since Dönitz himself was clearly acting in bad faith. He proposed that the definitive act of surrender should make it clear that the Commanders in Chief of each of the German armed services were, in signing it, surrendering their forces on the authority of the German High Command – and not as delegated by Dönitz or the purported Flensburg government.

A second, amended, instrument of surrender was accordingly signed at Karlshorst, Berlin, on 8 May shortly before midnight. Marshal Georgy Zhukov signed for the Soviet High Command, and British Marshal of the Royal Air Force Arthur Tedder, 1st Baron Tedder signed on behalf of the Western Allies (Tedder acted as Eisenhower's representative at the Berlin ceremony, and signed "on behalf of the Supreme Commander, Allied Expeditionary Force", in his capacity as Deputy Supreme Commander). French General Jean de Lattre de Tassigny and United States Army Air Forces General Carl Spaatz signed as the official witnesses. The Allies had demanded that representatives of the German Army, Navy, and Air Force, and the High Command of the Armed Forces, sign the ratification of unconditional surrender, and that they should present full powers authorising them to do so on behalf of the German High Command. Complying with that demand, Dönitz issued a telegraphed communication from his "Supreme Commander Headquarters" (Der Oberste Befehlshaber Hauptquartier) granting the necessary full powers, and accordingly the second Act of Military Surrender was signed by Keitel as Chief of the High Command of the Armed Forces and as acting Commander in Chief of the Army; by Friedeburg as the Commander in Chief of the Kriegsmarine, by General Hans-Jürgen Stumpff as Deputy Commander in Chief of the Luftwaffe, as Field Marshal Robert Ritter von Greim, the Luftwaffe commander, had been injured. At the time specified, World War II in Europe ended. On 9 May, Dönitz issued orders to the German Armed Forces regarding the military surrender.

The text of the definitive surrender document signed in Berlin differed from that previously signed at Reims, chiefly in that, to the second article was added the words "[...] and to disarm completely, handing over their weapons and equipment to the local allied commanders or officers designated by the Representatives of the Allied Supreme Command"; which had the effect of requiring German troops facing Soviet forces to hand over their weapons, disband and give themselves up as prisoners. Otherwise, neither the Reims nor the Berlin surrender instruments provided explicitly for the surrender of the German State, because the draft surrender document prepared by the European Advisory Commission (EAC) was not used. Instead, a simplified, military-only version was produced by the SHAEF, based largely on the wording of the partial surrender instrument of German forces in Italy that was signed at Caserta. This definition of the surrender as an act of military capitulation side-stepped any Allied recognition of the German Government or of Dönitz as Head of State. The question of the civil effects of the unconditional surrender was only settled later, when on 23 May the Allies decided to dissolve the Flensburg Government and on 5 June issued the Berlin declaration, proclaiming the direct assumption of the supreme governmental authority in Germany by the Allied Powers. The text of the Berlin Declaration was widely based on the EAC's draft instrument of surrender of Germany. The draft was reworked into a unilateral declaration with an extended explanatory preamble that spelt out the Allied position that, as a result of its complete defeat, Germany was left without a government, a vacuum that the direct assumption of supreme authority by the Allies would replace.

== Reichssender Flensburg ==
The Reichssender Flensburg was a temporary broadcasting station set up in the main post office in Flensburg. From 3 to 13 May 1945, it broadcast a program on the medium-wave frequency 1330 kHz featuring announcements from prominent members of the Dönitz government, including the announcement of the end of World War II in Europe. Along with the station in Prague, the station was the last propaganda facility available to the declining Nazi regime.

The listenership of the Reichssender Flensburg was limited. This was partly due to the comparatively low transmission power and partly because many people no longer owned radios or their power supply had failed. Nevertheless, the broadcasts could be received throughout the declining German Reich, albeit with better quality in northern Germany.

The British subjected the station to censorship starting on 10 May and finally shut it down on 13 May.

== Dissolution ==
=== Withdrawal of diplomatic recognition ===
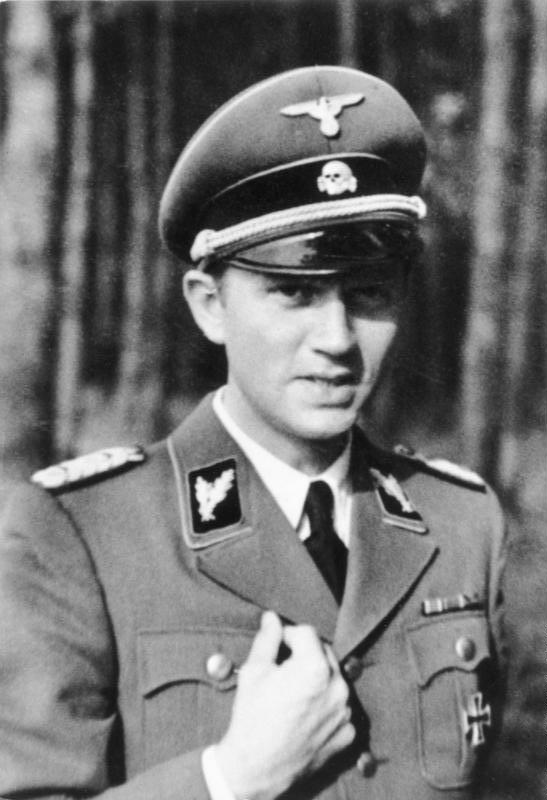
Walter Schellenberg

During 1944 and 1945, countries that had been neutral or allies of Germany had been joining the Allied Powers and declaring war on Germany. The German embassies to these countries had been closed down, and their property and archives held in trust by a nominated protecting power (usually Switzerland or Sweden) under the terms of the Geneva Conventions. There were counterpart arrangements for the former embassies of Allied countries in Berlin. The United States Department of State had prepared for the diplomatic consequences of the war ending on the assumption that there would have been an explicit statement of unconditional surrender of the German state in accordance with the terms of a draft surrender text jointly agreed by the Allied powers in 1944. In the final days of April 1945, the State Department had notified the protecting powers and all other remaining neutral governments that following the forthcoming German surrender, the continued identity of the German state would rest solely in the four Allied Powers. The Allied Powers would immediately recall all German diplomatic staff, take ownership of all German state property, extinguish all protecting power functions, and require the transfer of all archives and records to one or another of the embassies of the Western Allies.

On 8 May 1945, these arrangements were put into effect in full, notwithstanding that the only German parties to the signed surrender document had been the German High Command. The western Allies maintained that a functioning German civil and diplomatic state had already ceased to exist, and that consequently the surrender of the German military had effected the complete termination of Nazi Germany. The protecting powers complied fully with the Allied demands: Sweden, Switzerland, and Ireland announced the breaking off of relations; consequently, the German state ceased as a diplomatic entity on 8 May 1945. The diplomatic staff of neutral countries still in Germany were thus recalled, while those of countries at war with the Allies were taken prisoner by the Allies.

Notably, Japanese ambassador Hiroshi Ōshima and his legation were among those taken into custody. Despite Ōshima's objections, he and his staff had been ordered by Hitler to leave Berlin for Bad Gastein in Austria, which resulted in them being captured by the US Army. Had they been permitted to remain in Berlin, any surviving Japanese diplomats would presumably have been quickly repatriated to Japan since they were not yet at war with the Soviet Union. The Empire of Japan, which, after the German surrender, was effectively the only remaining Axis belligerent, promptly denounced the German surrender and the Flensburg government and seized the German embassy in Tokyo and seven U-boats.

Henceforward, although the Flensburg government had a nominated Minister for Foreign Affairs, it had no access to the diplomatic assets of the former German state and was not accorded diplomatic recognition by any of the former protecting powers, the other remaining neutral countries or any of its erstwhile allies in the Far East (i.e. the Japanese Empire and the puppet regimes still functioning under its control). On 5 May, Schwerin von Krosigk had dispatched Walter Schellenberg to Sweden as a personal emissary via Folke Bernadotte, hoping to establish diplomatic relations and to expedite a partial surrender of German forces in Norway. This mission was overtaken by the general capitulation of all German forces, and following 8 May, all further approaches from the Flensburg Government to Sweden were ignored.

Since Dönitz's surrender of northern Germany on 5 May, the Flensburg government was totally surrounded; after Victory in Europe, it became an enclave in an otherwise totally occupied country. Speer suggested that the Flensburg government should dissolve itself to avoid mockery. Because they were not immediately arrested by the British surrounding them, Dönitz and his ministers instead hoped that they could survive by being useful to the Allies as a provisional government. Armed German guards continued to march in the streets and remained stationed around government buildings that flew the Nazi flag. Allied visitors avoided giving orders. Even though they could exercise no direct territorial authority, the cabinet still met daily at 10:00 a.m. Various papers on post-war reconstruction issues were proposed to be prepared, but the Western Allies showed no sign that they might receive them. Otherwise, much time was devoted to discussion of how far the symbols, medals, and insignia of the Hitler regime should be retained within the Flensburg headquarters.

=== Nazi war crimes ===
Some acknowledgement of Nazi war crimes became unavoidable. The departure of the SS leadership from Flensburg opened the way for the Dönitz government to offer its own version of how the murder squads, concentration camps, and killing facilities had come into being. Their response was that all these atrocities had been undertaken in secret, and entirely by Himmler and the SS. Dönitz and Jodl issued a joint public statement "that neither the German Wehrmacht nor the German people had knowledge of these things." This rationale successfully planted the seeds for the decades-long myth of the "Clean Wehrmacht"—the misleading historical narrative that the regular German army fought an honorable, traditional war and was completely unaware of, or detached from, the genocide occurring around them.

=== Allied perspectives ===
While it had been agreed amongst the Allies that the Flensburg government should be accorded no official recognition, Winston Churchill proved reluctant to toe the line. In his speech announcing victory to the British people on 8 May, Churchill specified that the surrender had been authorised by "Grand Admiral Dönitz, the designated Head of the German State". Equally, following the unconditional surrender, Churchill was instrumental in urging that the Flensburg Government should not immediately be closed down, saying that he could see "great advantages in letting things slide for a while". Churchill's attitude in this was conditioned by his concern that Soviet forces might seek to establish themselves in Denmark; and he saw the temporary continuation of the Flensburg government in territory under British control as establishing a bargaining counter for the British in any negotiations regarding Soviet intentions in the western Baltic, while also facilitating the disbanding of German forces.

Conversely, Soviet statements consistently characterised the Flensburg government as an anti-Soviet clique, pursuing a truce in the west only to maintain resistance against Soviet forces in the east. On 20 May, the government of the USSR made it clear what it thought about the Flensburg Government. It attacked the Dönitz Administration, calling it the "Dönitz Gang" and harshly criticised any idea of allowing it to retain any power. Pravda said:

Discussions of the status of the Fascist gang around Dönitz continue. Several prominent Allied circles will deem it necessary to make use of the "services" of Dönitz and his collaborators. In the British Parliament, this gang has been described as the "Dönitz Administration" [...] A reporter of the reactionary Hearst press has called the enlistment of Dönitz "an act of political sagacity". Thus, a Fascist scribbler has seen fit to make common cause with Hitler's marauding disciple. At the same time, the Fascist press on both sides of the Atlantic has put it abroad that conditions in Germany in 1918, when German Rightists produced similar fairy-tales of impending chaos. Then, the intact German Army units were used for new adventures in the East, immediately after capitulation. The present campaign has similar objectives. Many reactionary circles around the Allies are opposed to the creation of a new Europe on the basis of the Crimea Conference. These circles consider the preservation of Fascist states and breeding grounds as a means of thwarting the democratic aspirations of all freedom-loving nations [...]

Eisenhower tended rather to agree with the Soviet position (if not the reasoning behind it), suspecting that Dönitz and his cabinet could be a front, while the real German leadership, perhaps including Himmler, Bormann, and Hitler himself (whose remains were not then known to have been identified), remained operating behind the scenes, or otherwise plotting for their concealment and escape. With ill-disguised reluctance, Eisenhower agreed to defer to the British view for a short period, but issued a clarifying statement that the continuation of the Dönitz government did not constitute his being recognised as a head of state "but only and temporarily under the instructions of the Allied Commanders to carry out duties concerning the feeding, disarming and medical care of the German Armed Forces."

=== Termination and arrest of the Flensburg Government ===
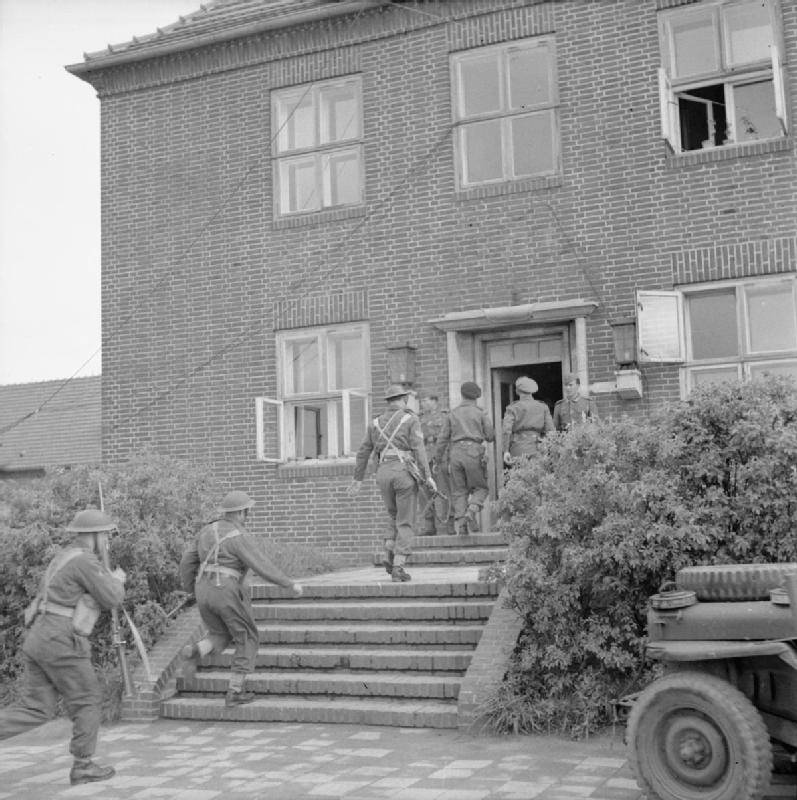
British soldiers of the Cheshire Regiment enter the sports school in Flensburg-Mürwik during Operation Blackout, to arrest members of the Flensburg Government, 23 May 1945

Three members of the Flensburg Government, General Alfred Jodl, Dr Albert Speer, and Grand Admiral Karl Dönitz, after their arrest by the British

On 12 May, US Major General Lowell Ward Rooks and his British deputy, Brigadier E. J. Foord, arrived in Flensburg and established their quarters in the passenger ship Patria, docked in Flensburg harbour, displacing the administrative offices of the Flensburg government that had been housed there. Their mission was to liaise with the Dönitz "acting government" (as it was then referred to by the SHAEF) and to impose the will of the victorious Allied Powers on the OKW. On 13 May, the British authorities ordered Dönitz to arrest Keitel for war crimes. Dönitz appointed Jodl as his replacement.

Dönitz thought that the meeting recognised him as the head of state of Germany. Rooks and SHAEF were actually puzzled over what to do with the Nazi remnant, although it is possible that Rooks had orders to examine the Flensburg government as a tool of governance for the Allies. Regardless, on 15 May, he described to Smith that it was a "rapidly decaying concern" and recommended dissolving OKW. On 17 May, Rooks, Foord, and Ambassador Robert D. Murphy recommended immediately dissolving "the so-called acting government". On 19 May, SHAEF, with Soviet approval, ordered the arrest of the Flensburg government.

The operation to terminate the government was dubbed Operation Blackout and began at 10:00 am on 23 May. It was carried out by British troops of the Cheshire Regiment and the Herefordshire Regiment, supported by tanks of the 15th/19th Hussars. Government buildings in Felnsbough and Glücksburg Castle were occupied while two Royal Navy destroyers, Zodiac and Zealous were deployed in Flensburg Fjord to ensure no members of the government escaped by sea. By 11:30 am, 5,000 German prisoners had been taken.

Dönitz, Friedeburg, and Jodl were then taken aboard the Patria, where Rooks informed them of the dissolution of the government, placing them under arrest, and ordered that they be stripped and searched for concealed vials of poison. The communication regarding the dissolution of the acting government and the arrest of its members was made in a formal manner, around a table on Patria's deck: Dönitz, Jodl, and Friedeburg sat on one side, with Rooks, British Navy Captain Mund and Soviet General Trusov on the other. Foord remained standing, next to Rooks and an official interpreter was also present at the proceedings, which were photographed.

By the time Dönitz emerged from the ship, the town's main street was filled with British tanks and troops rounding up the Germans. Faced with the prospect of being strip-searched, Friedeburg committed suicide, while Dönitz, Schwerin von Krosigk, Speer, Jodl, and other members of the dissolved Flensburg Government were taken prisoner, under the responsibility of the RAF Regiment task force commanded by Squadron Leader Mark Hobden.

The prisoners were later handed over to the King's Shropshire Light Infantry. Some Flensburg Government POWs, such as Speer, were subsequently moved to the British POW camp Dustbin in Kransberg Castle, while others, including Dönitz, were transferred to the US-led Camp Ashcan. Later, all Camp Ashcan prisoners were moved to Nuremberg to stand trial.

=== Berlin Declaration: 5 June 1945 ===
With the arrest of the Flensburg Government on 23 May 1945, the German High Command also ceased to exist, with no central authority having been kept in place to govern Germany even in a nominal capacity, or to assume responsibility for complying with the demands and instructions of the victorious nations. This power vacuum continued for almost two weeks until 5 June 1945, when the representatives of the four Allied Powers signed the Declaration Regarding the Defeat of Germany and the Assumption of Supreme Authority by Allied Powers, also known as the Berlin Declaration.

The declaration, issued in Berlin at 18:00 on 5 June 1945, and signed by Eisenhower on behalf of the United States, Montgomery on behalf of the United Kingdom, Zhukov on behalf of the Soviet Union, and by de Tassigny on behalf of the Provisional Government of the French Republic, contained the following statement:

The Governments of the United States of America, the Union of Soviet Socialist Republics and the United Kingdom and the Provisional Government of the French Republic, hereby assume supreme authority with respect to Germany, including all the powers possessed by the German Government, the High Command and any state, municipal, or local government or authority. The assumption, for the purposes stated above, of the said authority and powers does not effect the annexation of Germany.

Although the second sentence disclaimed the usual result of unconditional surrender — the permanent destruction of the surrendering state — in effect, the declaration on 5 June 1945 gave legal recognition to the state of affairs that had existed for all practical purposes from 23 May at the latest, which was that Germany did not possess a native government. Consequentially, complete authority and sovereignty were thereafter assumed by the Allied Military Occupation Government. The contention of the Allied Powers that the German state ceased to exist as of 5 June 1945 was then generally accepted, but came subsequently to be challenged in legal and political debate. In any event, the Berlin Declaration recognised the continued existence of Germany as a national territory and thus implied the continued existence of a German nation inhabiting that territory.

During the initial stage of the occupation of Germany, supreme authority was exercised jointly by the Four Powers for all occupation zones via the Allied Control Council. Therefore, this council was the immediate successor of the Dönitz Administration in governing the German national territories. Pursuant to the Potsdam Agreement, after 2 August 1945 the Allied Control Council limited its jurisdiction to the pre-war German territory west of the Oder-Neisse Line (i.e. the lands corresponding to Germany's present-day borders) thus implementing the Four Powers' decision to place Germany's pre-war territory east of the Oder-Neisse Line under direct Polish and Soviet administration.

== See also ==
- End of World War II in Europe
- German Instrument of Surrender
- Victory Day (9 May)
- Victory in Europe Day

== Bibliography ==
- Benvenisti, Eyal (2012). The International Law of Occupation. Oxford, UK: Oxford University Press. ISBN 978-0-19-958889-3.
- Jones, Michael (2015). After Hitler: The Last Days of the Second World War in Europe. John Murray (publishing house). ISBN 978-1848544963.
- Kershaw, Ian (2012). The End: Hitler's Germany 1944–1945. Penguin Books. ISBN 978-0-7139-9716-3.
- Knopp, Guido (2001) [1998]. Hitlers Krieger [Hitler's Warriors] (in Swedish). Translated by Irheden, Ulf. Leipzig: Goldmann (publisher). ISBN 91-89442-17-2.
- Walter Lüdde-Neurath, Unconditional Surrender: The Last Days of the Third Reich and the Dönitz Administration.
- Marlis G. Steinert, Capitulation, 1945: The Story of the Dönitz Regime (1967).
