= Goebbels cabinet =

Emergency German government following the death of Hitler

Cabinet of Joseph Goebbels
- 2nd Cabinet of Nazi Germany
- 30 April 1945 – 1 May 1945
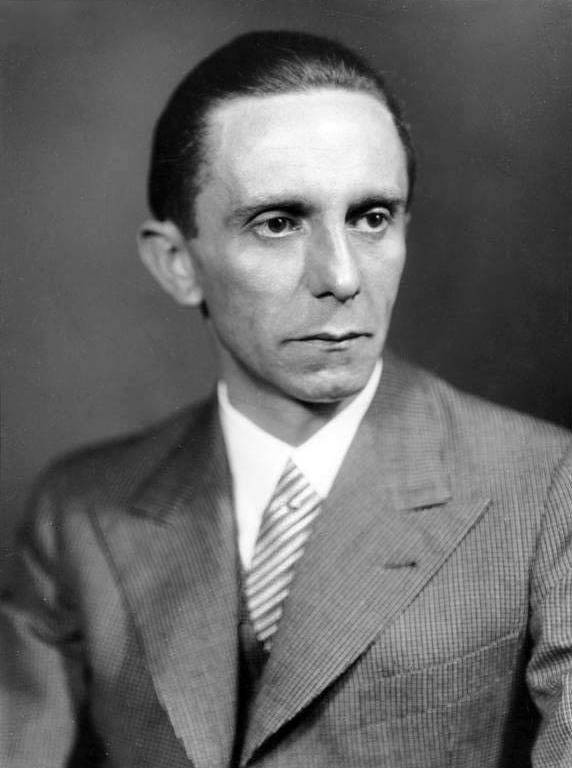
- Date formed: 30 April 1945; 81 years ago
- Date dissolved: 1 May 1945; 81 years ago (1 day)

People and organisations
- Reichspräsident: Karl Dönitz
- Chancellor of Germany: Joseph Goebbels
- Chancellor of Germany's history: Reichsminister of Public Enlightenment and Propaganda (1933–1945)
- Appointed by: Adolf Hitler
- Member party: Nazi Party
- Status in legislature: Sole legal party

History
- Predecessor: Hitler cabinet
- Successor: Flensburg Government

The Goebbels cabinet was named by Adolf Hitler in his political testament of 30 April 1945. The cabinet was therefore not legitimised according to the Weimar Constitution, which was still formally in force. To replace himself, Hitler named Admiral Karl Dönitz as Reichspräsident and Propaganda Minister Joseph Goebbels as Reichskanzler. The cabinet was short-lived as Goebbels killed himself along with his family on 1 May, after trying to reach a peace agreement with the Soviet Union. His government was followed by the Flensburg Government under Dönitz.

== Composition ==
Portfolio	Minister	Took office	Left office	Party
Reichspräsident	Karl Dönitz	30 April 1945	23 May 1945	NSDAP
Chancellor	Joseph Goebbels	30 April 1945	1 May 1945 (died)	NSDAP
Party Minister	Martin Bormann	30 April 1945	2 May 1945 (died)	NSDAP
Minister for Foreign Affairs	Arthur Seyss-Inquart	30 April 1945	2 May 1945	NSDAP
Minister of the Interior	Paul Giesler	30 April 1945	3 May 1945	NSDAP
Minister of War	Karl Dönitz	30 April 1945	23 May 1945	NSDAP
Supreme Commander of the Army	Ferdinand Schörner	30 April 1945	8 May 1945	NSDAP
Supreme Commander of the Navy	Karl Dönitz	30 January 1943	1 May 1945	NSDAP
Supreme Commander of the Air Force	Robert Ritter von Greim	26 April 1945	8 May 1945	NSDAP
Head of the SS and German Police	Karl Hanke	29 April 1945	8 May 1945	NSDAP
Reich Minister of Economics	Walther Funk	5 February 1938	5 May 1945	NSDAP
Minister for Food and Agriculture	Herbert Backe	23 May 1942	23 May 1945	NSDAP
Minister of Justice	Otto Georg Thierack	20 August 1942	5 May 1945	NSDAP
Minister of Culture	Gustav Adolf Scheel	30 April 1945	3 May 1945	NSDAP
Minister of Propaganda	Werner Naumann	30 April 1945	5 May 1945	NSDAP
Minister of Finance	Lutz Graf Schwerin von Krosigk	1 June 1932	23 May 1945	NSDAP
Minister of Labour	Theo Hupfauer	30 April 1945	5 May 1945	NSDAP
Minister of Armament	Karl Saur	30 April 1945	5 May 1945	NSDAP
Leader of the Deutscher Arbeitsfront	Robert Ley	10 May 1933	8 May 1945	NSDAP

Retaining some members from the previous Hitler cabinet, some members of the Goebbels cabinet would continue in the Dönitz cabinet.

== Actions ==
According to the memoirs of Karl Dönitz, who was then in Plön, he got, in the presence of Albert Speer, a radio signal from Martin Bormann at the Reich Chancellery, at 18.15 on the evening of 30 April. The telegram informed Dönitz that he was the Führer's successor and "authorised to take any measures which the situation demands". Shortly thereafter, Dönitz asked Heinrich Himmler to meet him, which he did at midnight. (Earlier during the day, Bormann had written to Dönitz about Himmler's "treachery" and that the Führer "expects you to take instant and ruthless action against traitors".) After reading the telegram containing the appointment of Dönitz, Himmler said: "Allow me to become the second man in your state". Dönitz, who thought that Himmler was "intolerable", replied that this was out of the question. Himmler left Dönitz about one o'clock in the morning. Dönitz got another signal, dispatched at 07.40 on 1 May. Bormann wrote that the Führer's will was now in force. "Coming to you as quickly as possible", Bormann wrote, noting that Dönitz, pending Bormann's arrival, should, in Bormann's opinion, "refrain from public statement".

Dönitz, who did not know how Hitler had died, did not agree with Bormann on this. Dönitz broadcast an announcement about him assuming "leadership of the German people". He also assumed leadership of all the armed forces, in a separate order the same day. He also issued a declaration to the members of the German Armed Forces claiming that the Hitler Oath "now binds each and every one of you to me, whom he himself appointed as his successor". Dönitz then tried to get in touch with Konstantin von Neurath to appoint him both Foreign Minister and Prime Minister, but failed.

The third and last signal from the Reich Chancellery in Berlin, Dönitz got at 15:18 and it had been dispatched at 14:46 on 1 May. Here, Dönitz was informed that the Führer died on 30 April at 15:30, and that he, in his will dated 29 April, appointed Dönitz as Reichspräsident, Goebbels as Reich Chancellor, Bormann as Party Minister and Arthur Seyss-Inquart as Foreign Minister. It was also stated that Bormann would try to reach Dönitz the same day "to explain the situation". The telegram was signed Goebbels, Bormann. Dönitz felt that the choice of ministers "were in complete variance" with his ideas, and with the earlier signal instructing him to "take any measures which the situation demands". He felt unable to obey the instructions in any way. Thus, he directed that Goebbels and Bormann were to be arrested if they appeared in Plön.

As Reich Chancellor, Goebbels dictated a letter to Soviet commander Vasily Chuikov, who commanded the Red Army in Berlin. The letter, dated 30 April and signed by Goebbels and Bormann, was delivered to the Soviet headquarters by Hans Krebs under a white flag. The letter informed the Soviets of Hitler's suicide. Krebs stated in the letter that he had been authorised by the new Reich Chancellor to establish contact with the Soviets, "intended to ascertain to what extent it is possible to establish a basis for peace between the German people and the Soviet Union that will serve the good and future of both peoples, who suffered the greatest losses in the war".

Negotiations between Krebs and Chuikov lasted about five hours. Stalin, who had been informed by telephone as soon as Krebs arrived, asked Krebs questions through Chuikov. When asked if there had been any announcement about Hitler's death, Krebs answered: "We will not announce Hitler's suicide and his will, because [Himmler] will find out about it and use it to create his own government." He added that Himmler was a traitor and had been expelled from the Nazi Party. Krebs informed the Soviets that this had not been made public or known to Himmler and that it should be "when the armistice conditions are in place and the new government is legalised."

When asked if Goebbels "was thinking of giving up Berlin in view of the hopeless situation of the garrison", Krebs answered that Goebbels "could not make a decision about capitulation and the surrender of Berlin without Dönitz". The Soviet conclusions from the conversation with Krebs were that "Goebbels' main goal was to test the possibility of recognition by the Soviet Government of the proposed German government" and that Goebbels and Bormann did not consider it possible to surrender Berlin on terms of unconditional surrender, before receiving an armistice guarantee.

Krebs asked for Soviet permission to send his officer by car across the Soviet front line to receive instructions from Dönitz. This request was denied by the Soviet general. Krebs' mission had utterly failed and the Soviet command refused anything but an unconditional surrender.

Goebbels and his wife Magda Goebbels committed suicide after about 20:30 on 1 May. Bormann left the Führerbunker around 23:00 and died on 2 May. Krebs killed himself in the bunker during the early hours of 2 May.
