= Marlis G. Steinert =

German historian

Marlis Steinert (born Marlis Gertrud Johanna Dalmer; 1922–2005) was a German historian.

Steinert obtained her doctorate degree from the University of the Sarre, under the supervision of Jean-Baptiste Duroselle in 1956. She then assisted historian Jacques Freymond with his research for the book "Le conflit sarrois, 1945-1955".

She then became a professor at the Graduate Institute of International Studies, where she taught until her retirement in 1988.

She participated in the founding of the journal Relations internationales in 1972, and took the co-presidency of the editorial committee with Pierre Guillen in 1982. She left her place to Pierre Du Bois in 1998.

== Work ==
Steiner researched the history of Nazi Germany, publishing among other things a biography of Adolf Hitler. In her work, she argued that the German population was unaware of the immensity of the atrocities committed against the Jews. She also promoted a non-orthodox thesis contending that Hitler, shortly prior to his suicide in Berlin in April 1945, had a change of heart and concluded that the policies of the Third Reich were disastrous, and for that reason appointed Admiral Karl Dönitz as his successor rather than any member of the Nazi bureaucracy which he cultivated, with the hope he would lead a more accommodating policy towards the Allied Powers. She also claimed that Admiral Dönitz, during the short-lived Flensburg Government in May 1945 hoped to lead postwar Germany with the purpose of conducting peaceful policies that will not repeat the policy of invading other countries and holding foreign populations as slave labor. This thesis in not very acceptable in academic circles.

She also studied and taught international relations, particularly the foreign policies of the United States and Japan.

== Books (partial list) ==
- Hitler's War and the Germans: Public Mood and Attitude During the Second World War
- 23 Days: The Final Collapse of Nazi Germany (1967)

== Private life ==
She married the doctor and photographer Otto Steinert in 1943.
