= Bombing of Wesel in World War II =

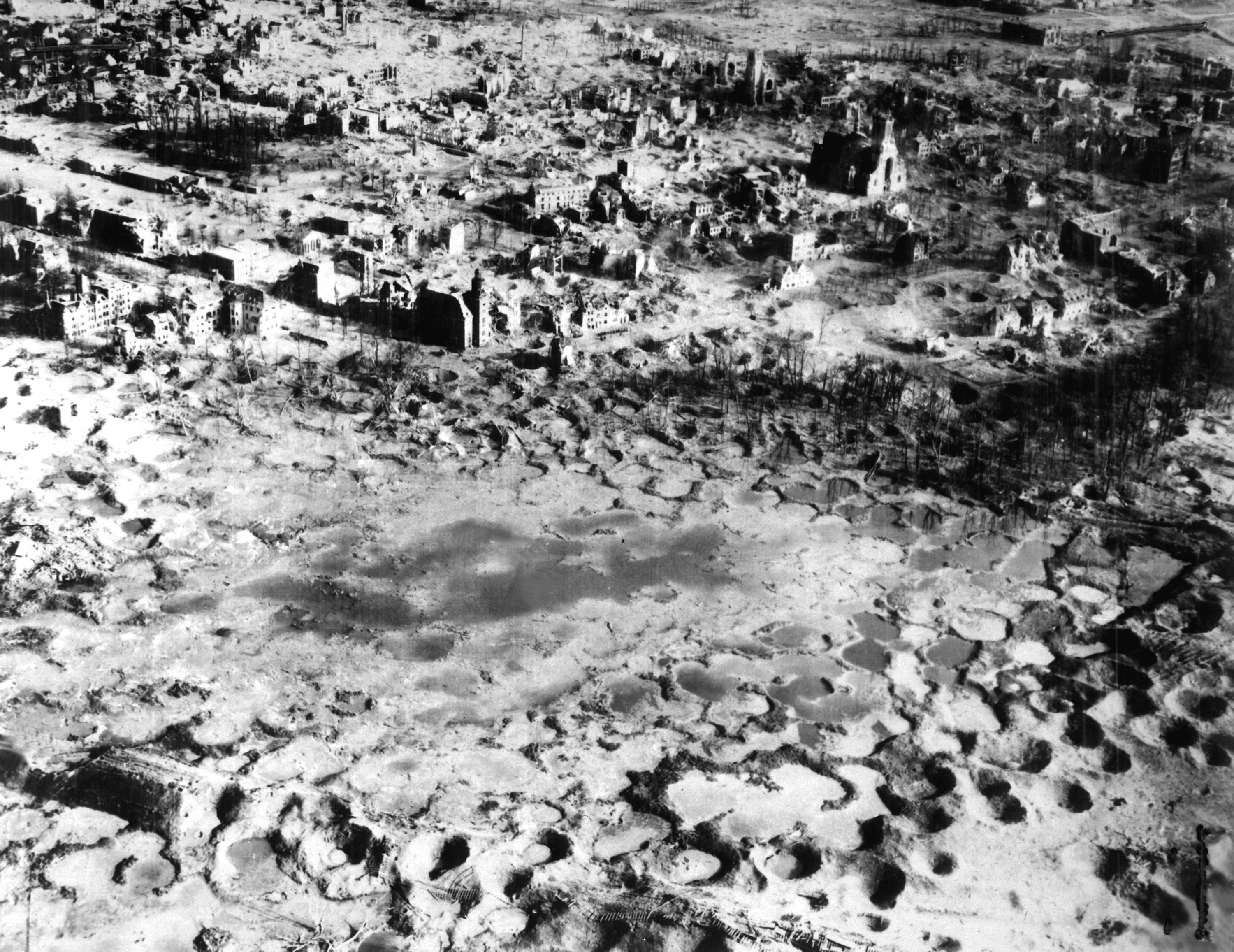
97% of Wesel was destroyed before it was finally taken by Allied troops

The German town of Wesel was heavily bombed in Allied air raids during World War II. Between this and the attacks in support of the crossing of the Rhine, the town was devastated.

Wesel became a target of the Allies, particularly in its strategic position with a depot and the Wesel Railway Bridge over the Rhine. On the 16, 17, 18 and 19 February 1945, the town was attacked by the British Royal Air Force with impact and air-burst weapons with it resulting in the town almost being entirely destroyed.

The Rhine and Lippe bridges were blown by the Wehrmacht, among others, on 10 March 1945. The 1,950m long railway bridge was the last Rhine bridge remaining in German hands.

On 23 March, Wesel came under the fire of over 3,000 guns when it was bombarded anew, in preparation for Operation Plunder. That day 80 Lancasters from No. 3 Group RAF attacked Wesel. Then that night of 23/24 March, 195 Lancasters and 23 Mosquitos of RAF Bomber Command No. 5 Group aided in the softening up of the German defenders. 97% of the town was destroyed before it was finally taken by Allied troops and the population had fallen from almost 25,000 in 1939 to 1,900 in May 1945.

The town was taken quickly. Field Marshal Bernard Montgomery, commanding the Anglo-Canadian 21st Army Group, said "the bombing of Wesel was a masterpiece, and was a decisive factor in making possible our entry into the town before midnight."

== See also ==
- Wesel Railway Bridge
