= 371st =

371st may refer to:

- 371st Bombardment Squadron, inactive United States Air Force unit
- 371st Engineer Construction Battalion or 371st Engineer Battalion, activated as a Special Service Regiment in the United States Army in 1944
- 371st Fighter Group or 142nd Fighter Wing, a unit of the Oregon Air National Guard, stationed at Portland Air National Guard Base, Oregon
- 371st Fighter Squadron
- 371st Infantry Regiment (United States), an African American regiment, nominally a part of the 93rd Infantry Division (Colored), that served in World War I
- 371st Sustainment Brigade (United States), Ohio Army National Guard sustainment Brigade

== See also ==
- 371 (number)
- 371, the year 371 (CCCLXXI) of the Julian calendar
- 371 BC
