= Camp Ellis =

US Army training center

Coordinates: 40°22′28″N 90°21′30″W

Camp Ellis was a United States World War II Army Service Forces Unit Training Center and prisoner-of-war camp between the towns of Bernadotte, Ipava, and Table Grove in Fulton County, Illinois. Construction began on 17 September 1942, and the camp opened on 16 April 1943, with an official dedication 14 July 1943. German prisoners of war were guarded by the 475th and 476th Military Police Escort Guard Companies. Training activities ended in November 1944.

== History ==
The camp was named after Sergeant Michael B. Ellis, a World War I Medal of Honor recipient from East Saint Louis, Illinois.

According to the Pentagon Report on Camp Ellis, the camp was officially occupied on 1 February 1943 under the Sixth Service Command. It included facilities of: USF Unit Training Center, Engineer and Medical Officers Replacement Pools, Training Center & POW Camp.

Effective as of 1 October 1945 Camp Ellis, Illinois was placed in the category of surplus (entire camp). 17,478 acres WD owned at cost to Govt (land and buildings of $23,076,438 certified to SPS (WD-#257) 11 October 1945).

The Shawnee National Forest, Camp Ellis, and Illinois maneuver area were transferred to the Department of Agriculture 29 November 1945 (35,375 acres Public Lands).

Effective 11 December 1945, the Camp Ellis Military Reservation, Illinois, entire camp 28,557 military housing, 17,455 acres WD owned, at cost to Govt. (land and buildings) of $23,076,438 was withdrawn from surplus and placed in inactive revocable license to State of Illinois as National Guard Camp-per Monthly Progress Report, OCE, dated 30 January 1946.

Camp Ellis, Military Reservation, Ill., designated as Class II installation, subject to re-entry upon 120 days' notice, under the jurisdiction of the Commanding General, Army Ground Forces, 22 March 1946.

Effective 25 September 1946 reclassified as a Class I installation under jurisdiction of Commanding General, Fifth Army.

Camp Ellis, Table Grove, Ill., inactive 11 December 1945, except housing surplus 8 January 1947.

5013th ASF, Camp Ellis, Ill. reorganized under T/D #205-1013, Fifth Army, Chicago, Ill. December 1947, and 30 June 1948.

Effective 30 November 1949, Camp Ellis, Ill., less certain facilities to be retained for use by Illinois National Guard, was declared excess to requirements of Department of Army and was approved for disposal (DA Cir120), 1 December 1949." Pentagon Report on Camp Ellis

== Units served ==
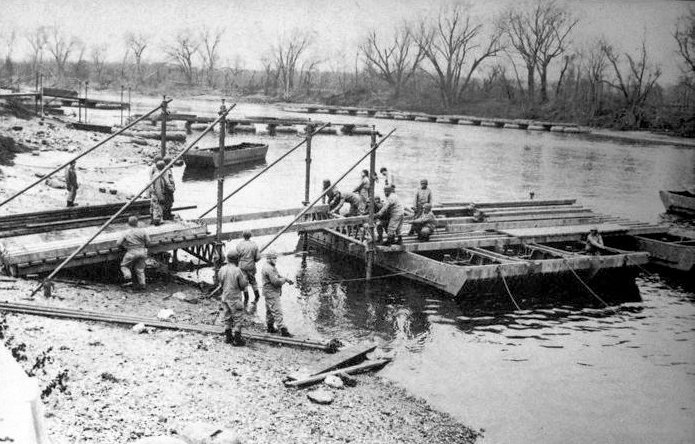
Engineers Training at Camp Ellis, Illinois.

1. 3052nd Quartermaster Salvage Col Co.
2. 738th Engineer Base Depot Company
3. 567th Engineer Dump Truck Company
4. 539th Salvage Repair Company
5. 475th Military Police Escort Guard Company
6. 476th Military Police Escort Guard Company
7. 4624th Service Unit (WAC) arrive in Camp Ellis 6 January 1944
8. 1301st Engineer General Service Regiment
9. 1303rd Engineer General Service Regiment Activated on 15 July 1943
10. 123rd Infantry Company A
11. 1317th Engineer General Service Regiment
12. 1332nd Engineer Regiment (African-American Unit)
13. 371st Engineer Construction Battalion
14. 1139th Engineer Combat Group Training and Deployment
15. 1319th, 1332nd, 1333rd Engineer Construction Groups
16. 1542nd, 1549thm 1550th Engineer Survey Company
17. 1309th, 1317th, 1319th, 1332nd Engineer Construction Group
18. 567th, 569th, 573rd, 575th, 792nd, 793rd, 891st, 1365th, 1366th, & 1367th Engineer Dump Truck Companies (African American units)
19. 1542nd, 15419th, 1550th Engineer Survey Companies
20. 1767th, 1785th, 1786th Engineer Parts & Supply Companies
21. 520th Transportation Battalion
22. 548th CSB
23. 600th Quartermaster Company
24. 533rd CSB
25. 123rd Infantry
26. 181st Transportation Battalion Activated 25 June 1943
27. 16th Company, 133rd Battalion, 30th Training Regiment. Capt. WM. J. Courchesne, Comdg., 1st Sgt. J. V. Salyard. July 1945
28. 3184 QUARTERMASTER SERVICE COMPANY APRIL 1944 (African-American Unit Cpl. Howard W. Jones)
29. 101st Medical Composite Detachment
30. 10th, 11th, 12th & 13th General Dispensary Companies
31. 103rd, 137th, 115th, 116th, 119th, 121st, 122nd, 123rd, 124th, 125th, 126th, 129th, 137th, 197th, 198th, 199th, 200th, 201st, 202nd, 227th, 228th, 229th, 230th, 231st, 311th, 312th, & 313th General Hospital Companies
32. 49th, 54th, 60th, 61st, 62nd, 63rd, 65th, 66th, 67th, 69th, 73rd, 75th, 81st, 83rd, 85th, 88th, 90th, 92nd, 93rd, 94th Field Hospital Companies
33. 13th, 22nd, 26th, 74th, 79th, & 80th Hospital Train Group
34. 74th & 76th Medical Base Depot units
35. 72nd & 85th Malarial Control Units
36. 94th & 95th Medical Gas Treatment Battalions
37. 1614th Prisoner of War, Prison Guard Detachment https://easleypioneermuseumil.historyarchives.online/viewer?i=f&by=1945&bdd=1940&d=07271945-07271945&fn=camp_ellis_news_usa_illinois_camp_ellis_19450727_english_1&df=1&dt=10&cid=3150
38. 1624th Military Police Unit
39. 417th, 418th, 419th, 420th, 617th Quartermaster Bakery Companies
40. 237th & 239th Quartermaster Salvage Collection Companies
41. 244th & 246th Signal Operation Companies
42. 264th & 274th Quartermaster Bakery Companies - Special Mobile (African American Unit)
43. 1301st, 1303rd, 1306th General Services Regiments
44. 851st, 852nd, 853rd, 854th, 859th, 863rd, 864th, 865th, 866th, Quartermaster Fumigation and Bath Mobile Companies
45. 459th, 461st, 597th, 598th, 599th, 600th Quartermaster Laundry Companies
