= Nero Decree =

1945 order issued by Adolf Hitler to destroy all German infrastructure

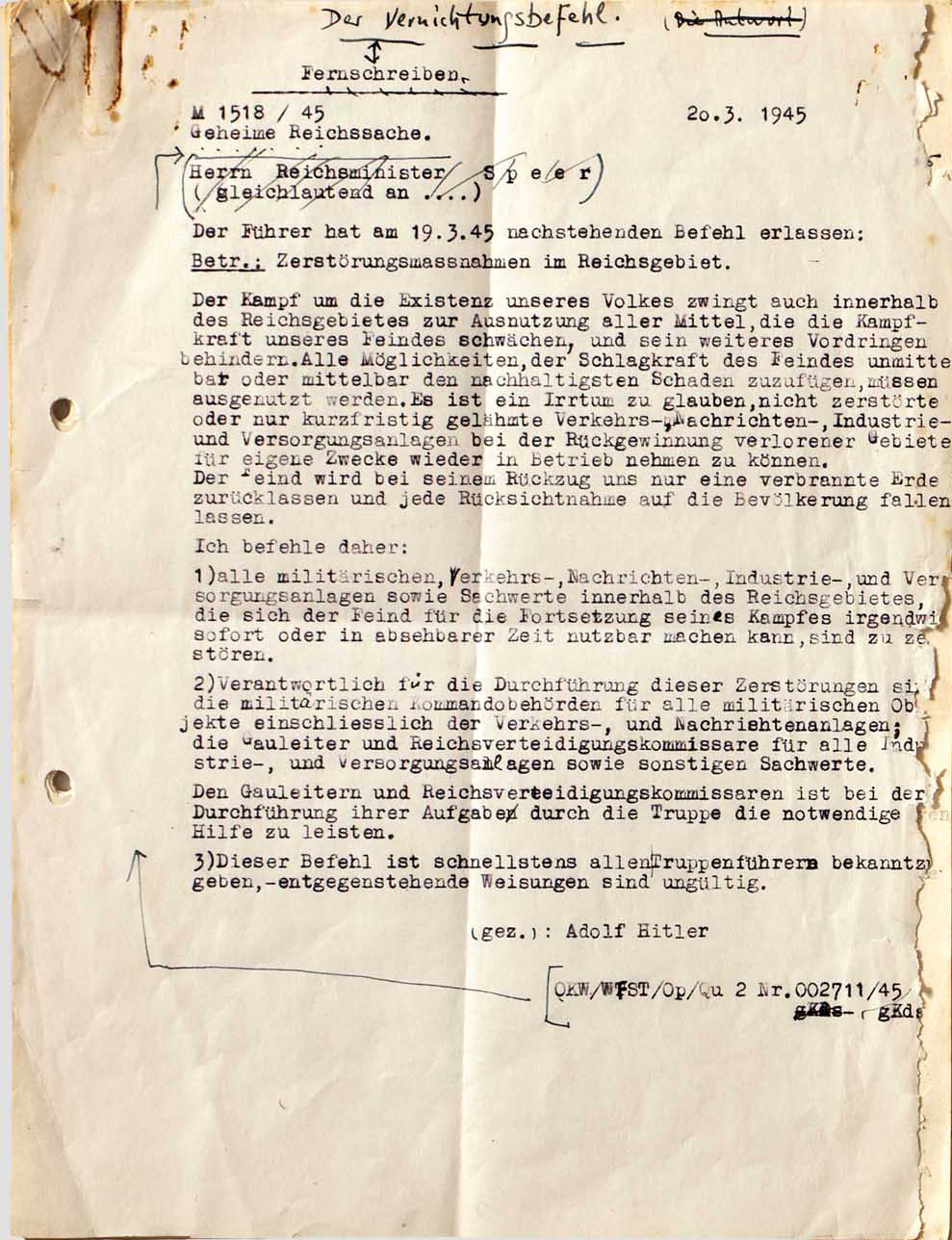
"Decree Concerning Demolitions in the Reich Territory", issued by Adolf Hitler on 19 March 1945

The Nero Decree (German: Nerobefehl) was a scorched earth policy issued by Adolf Hitler, dictator of Nazi Germany, on 19 March 1945, ordering the destruction of German infrastructure to prevent its use by Allied forces as they penetrated deep within Germany. It was officially titled Decree Concerning Demolitions in the Reich Territory (Befehl betreffend Zerstörungsmaßnahmen im Reichsgebiet) and has subsequently become known as the Nero Decree, after the Roman emperor Nero, who, according to an apocryphal story, engineered the Great Fire of Rome in 64 AD. The decree was deliberately disobeyed by Albert Speer shortly before the fall of the Nazi regime.

== Background ==
By the beginning of 1945, Germany faced imminent defeat. Most of the territory it conquered early in the war had been liberated or recaptured, the Ardennes Offensive had failed, and Allied armies were advancing on Germany proper from both the East and the West. However, Hitler was not willing to accept the terms of unconditional surrender, which he considered as repeating the same shame as Versailles. Moreover, according to some around him, Hitler came to view the German people as having failed him, unworthy of what he saw as their great mission in history and thus deserving to die alongside his regime.

This was not the first time Hitler had tried to destroy land he could no longer hold. On the eve of the Liberation of Paris, he ordered that the city "must not fall into the hands of the enemy except as a field of ruins.” However, the German military governor, Dietrich von Choltitz, did not carry out the order and surrendered to the Allies. He later claimed that this was the moment he realized that "Hitler was insane," although the French historian Lionel Dardenne disputes his characterization of events as a "self-serving fantasy." Similarly, Hitler had issued orders to enact a scorched earth policy upon the Netherlands in late 1944, when it became obvious that the Allies were about to retake the country, but Arthur Seyss-Inquart, the Reichskommissar in charge of the Netherlands during its occupation, was able to greatly limit the scope to which the order was executed.

== Decree ==
The order's most pertinent section reads as follows:

It is a mistake to think that transport and communication facilities, industrial establishments and supply depots, which have not been destroyed, or have only been temporarily put out of action, can be used again for our own ends when the lost territory has been recovered. The enemy will leave us nothing but scorched earth when he withdraws, without paying the slightest regard to the population. I therefore order:

1) All military transport and communication facilities, industrial establishments and supply depots, as well as anything else of value within Reich territory, which could in any way be used by the enemy immediately or within the foreseeable future for the prosecution of the war, will be destroyed.

== Actions ==
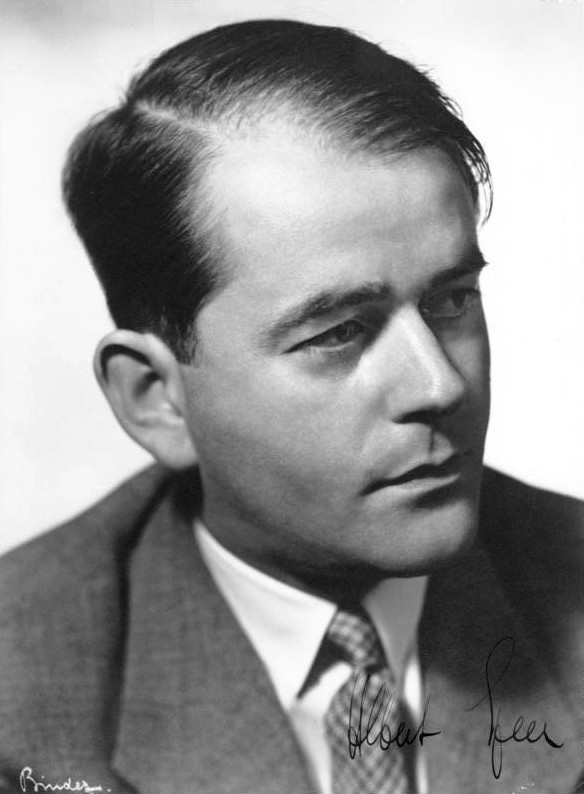
Albert Speer, Reich Minister of Armaments and War Production, was tasked with carrying out the order but refused, seeing it as a senseless act of destruction.

The decree was in vain. The responsibility for carrying it out fell to Albert Speer, Hitler's Minister of Armaments and War Production, who deliberately failed to carry it out. According to Speer, he was appalled by the order and lost faith in the Führer. Upon receiving it, he requested to be given exclusive power to implement the plan, instead using his power to convince the generals and Gauleiters to ignore the order. Hitler apparently remained unaware of this until the very end of the war. Speer later claimed that during his last meeting with Hitler in the Berlin Führerbunker on 22 April, he admitted to having deliberately disobeyed Hitler's instructions. By Speer's account, Hitler was angry with him, but allowed him to leave nonetheless. This version of events has been disputed by some historians, with Richard J. Evans describing it as "pure invention." Hitler committed suicide on 30 April 1945, forty-two days after having issued the order. Shortly afterwards, on 7 May 1945, General Alfred Jodl signed the German military surrender, and on 23 May Speer was arrested on the orders of U.S. General Dwight D. Eisenhower, together with the rest of the provisional German government led by Grand Admiral Karl Dönitz, Hitler's successor as head of state.

== See also ==
- Destruction of Warsaw
- Gotthard Heinrici
- Hellmuth Reymann
- Is Paris Burning?
- Morgenthau Plan
