= 371st Engineer Construction Battalion =

- Active: 1 February 1944 to 4 November 1945
- Country: United States of America
- Branch: Army
- Type: Engineer
- Role: Support
- Size: unknown troops
- Part of: ADSEC
- Motto: Need To Add
- Engagements: World War II
- Decorations: Meritorious Unit Commendation

Commanders
- Notable commanders: Lt Col. R. B. Jackson

371st Engineer Construction Battalion or 371st Engineer Battalion was activated as a Special Service Regiment in February 1944, as a unit in the United States Army. Later this unit was redesignated a General Service Regiment. The unit was formed at Camp Ellis, Illinois from some regular Army officers and enlisted men, trained in the United States, then shipped overseas early in World War II to Riverside Station, Liverpool, England. They were the vanguard of many others to follow, including infantry and armored troops. Their purpose was to build facilities in preparation for those to follow. After the Normandy Invasion, they followed the front lines constructing roads, railroad bridges, hospitals, and other infrastructure needed by the advancing Armies. Serving until the surrender by Germany, the unit was discharged from the military on 8 November 1945 and the service members returned home.

== Activation and Training ==
The unit formed and trained in Camp Ellis, Illinois in February 1944. Engineer "Special" and "General" Service Regiments with multipurpose skills were incorporated into the units. These large regimental units would have heavier engineer equipment, and consist of officers, non-commissioned

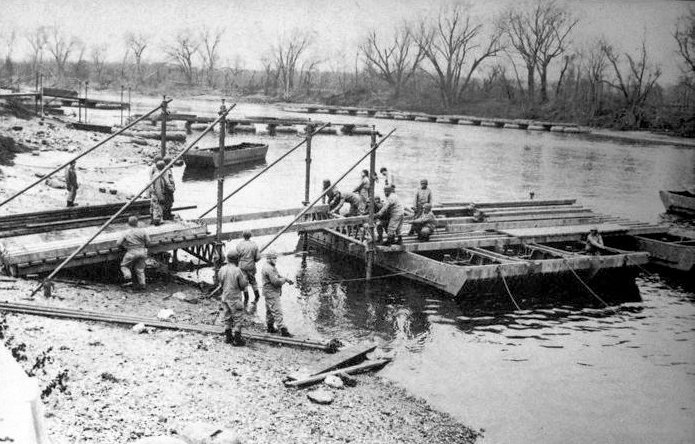
Engineers Training at Camp Ellis, Illinois.

officers and enlisted men who had experience in engineering or construction jobs. The best construction skills available in the country would be used to build these units.

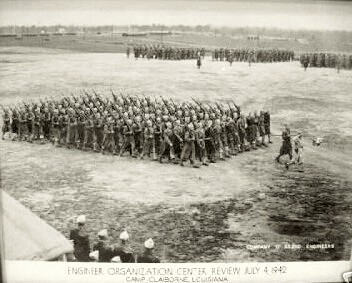
332nd Training at Camp Claiborne, LA

According to General Order number 21, the elements of the old General Service Regiments were designated as part of the new battalion making it a group of four companies; A, B, C, and HQ. The commanding officer through the formation of the battalion was Col. Adcock. However, during World War II, the unit was commanded by Colonel R. B. Jackson.

The Chief of Army Engineers ordered the recruitment of skilled personnel from construction in an organized unit. Some were recruited from Army Corps of Engineer Districts in the Omaha and Kansas City Districts. Others came from Camp Claiborne, Louisiana and various other locations throughout the Midwest.

Additional personnel arrived very quickly. The activities in the first months were very basic training and indoctrination into military life, since these citizen-soldiers already had experience in construction and engineering. They lived in tents and trained for several weeks in basic infantry training, including marches, rifle training, demolition training, identification of gases (e.g. mustard gas) and proper equipment, close order drill, etc. Their time at Camp Ellis was relatively short as they were needed to ship overseas in preparation for the Normandy Invasion.

== Deployment in Great Britain ==
The unit left Boston on 13 May 1944 bound for Liverpool, England with a convoy of several ships including USAT Brazil, carrying the 371st. The convoy arrived there 25 May 1944.

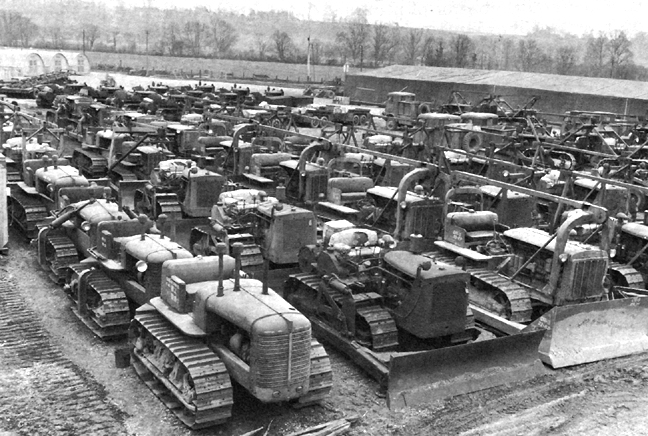
Staging of Bulldozers, Thatcham Depot, UK

On reaching England, 371st traveled by rail from Riverside Station, Liverpool, England to their first destination of Salisbury, England. The unit camped 5 miles (8 km) from Salisbury on Salisbury Plain near Druid's Lodge and Stonehenge.

The 371st initially was involved to build bases for the coming troops in preparation for D-Day in the Second World War.

In their first 1–2 months they built base camps for the Regiment, first from tents but eventually to more permanent Nissen huts. Training was conducted on how to build Bailey bridges. A depot was built at Thatcham. This depot was designed as a staging area for the US Army for assembly and shipping of equipment, supplies and gear to the western and northern ports of Britain, where ships were loaded for North Africa.

== Engineer Group ==
In order to concentrate engineering resources and to distribute available heavy equipment, the concept of the "engineer group" was begun. During the war the 371st worked closely with the 332nd Engineer General Service Regiment building bridges and supporting the troops.

== Invasion of Normandy ==
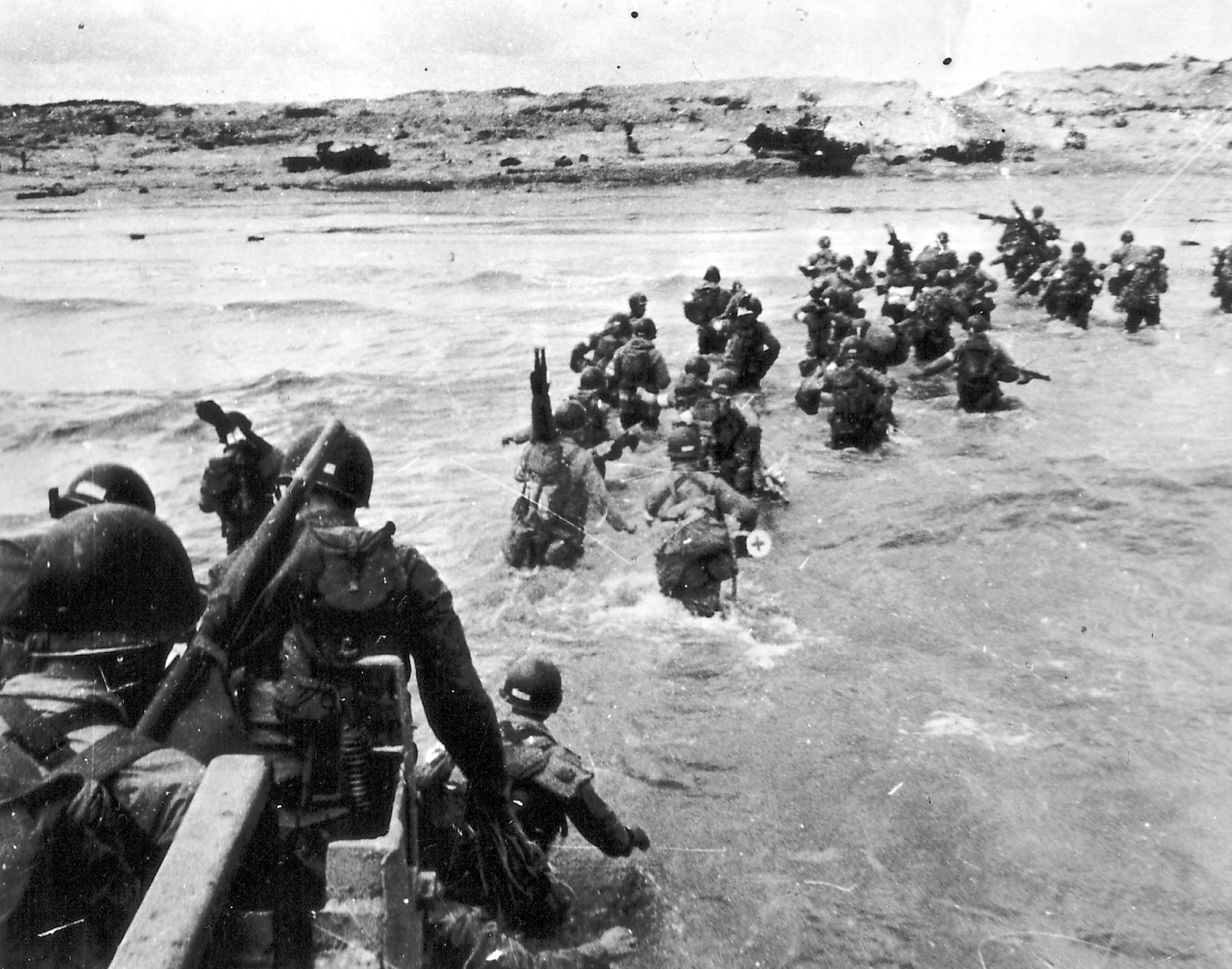
Utah Beach Landing, Normandy, France

This unit served with several of the Armies of World War II as it was part of ADSEC (Advanced Section, Communications Zone). ADSEC's mission was to support the U.S. First Army, U.S. Third Army, and U.S. Seventh Army by building bridges, roads and hospitals through France, Belgium and Germany.

On 6 September 1944 the unit traveled by bus to Southampton, England in preparation for the crossing to Europe. The next day, 7 September, the unit cleared their port of embarkation at 0600 hours. After crossing the English Channel, they landed on Utah Beach, Normandy, France at approximate 1630 hours on military "Operation Overlord", debarked and walked through mud and rain for 8 miles then pitched pup-tents around 2345 hours. They assembled then began with the task at hand, freeing Europe!

== The Malmédy Massacre ==
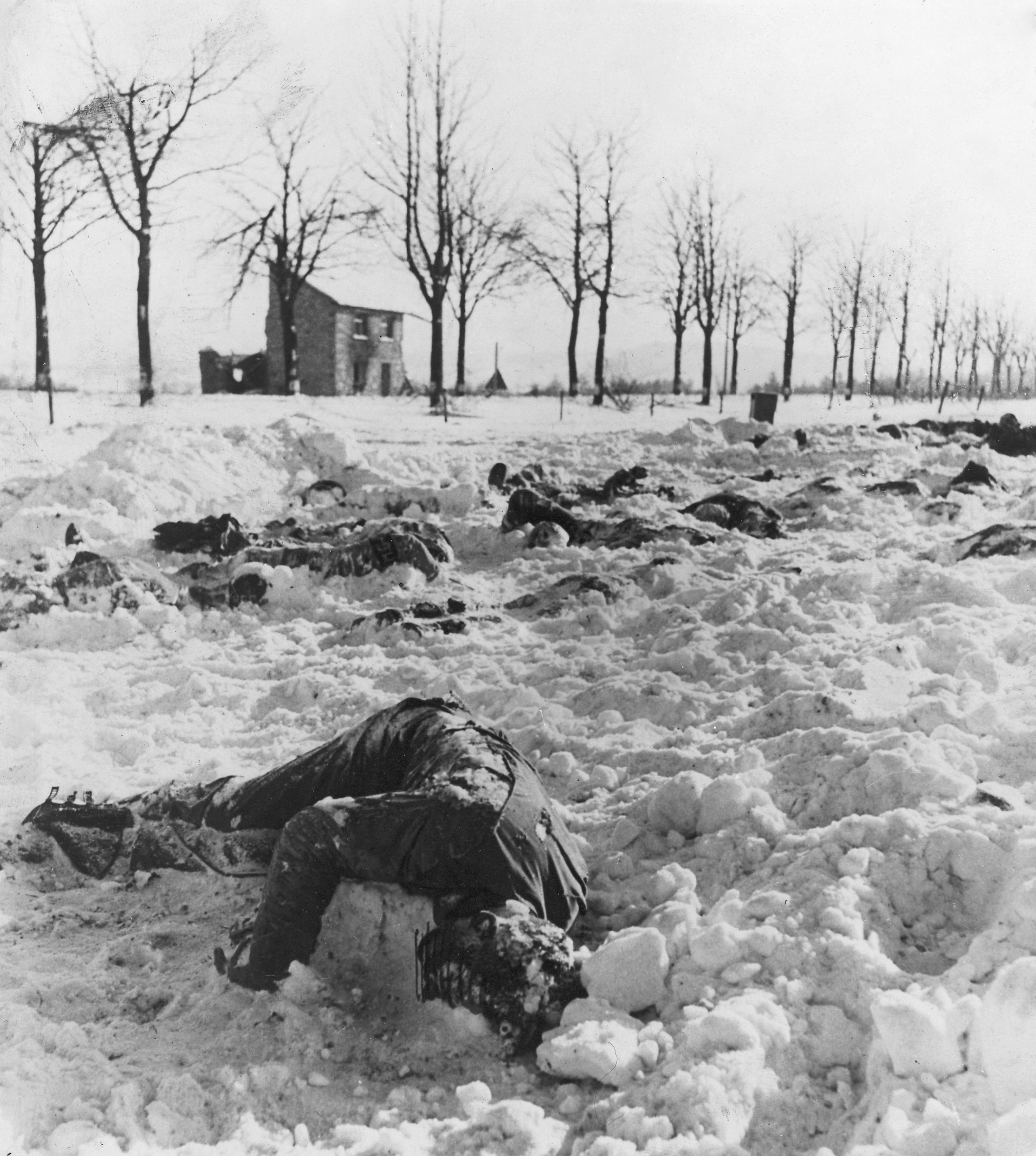
Murdered American soldiers at Malmedy on 14 January 1945.

Sometime around 17 December 1944, according to PFC Amos H. Rock of Company A, his company drove up on the Malmedy Massacre site near Malmédy, Belgium. He says they counted 159 bodies at the location and the Germans stripped them of their ammo, guns, and trucks. He also said dead soldiers were covered in snow and some had legs in the air and some not. Upon hearing this news, General George Patton was very upset and ordered take no more prisoners.

== Railway Bridge Construction ==
The greatest accomplishment of the 371st Engineer Construction Battalion (as a member of ASDEC Engineer Group) was the reconstruction of the Wesel Railway Bridge, 1,751 feet (534 m) long and 2140 tons, over the Rhine River in the record time of 10 days. The site of this bridge was crossing the Rhine River near the confluence of the Lippe River and the Rhine. The railroad bridge was completed 9 April 1945. The Wesel Bridge was dedicated to Major Bob Gouldin and two enlisted men who died in a boat accident while building it. They were going out on the river at night on an Engineer work boat and Commander Jackson believed they hit an anchor cable and flipped the boat over on the river. According to Col. Jackson the military bridge lasted seven years. That is a long time for a military bridge that did not meet civilian standards.

The 371st Engineer Battalion served in several campaigns including The Battle of the Bulge. The 371st received special commendation for completing the railroad bridge across the Rhine in 10 days, all the while allowing General Patton's advance into the German heartland. This was a fitting tribute to Army Engineering during WWII.

== Post War/ETS ==
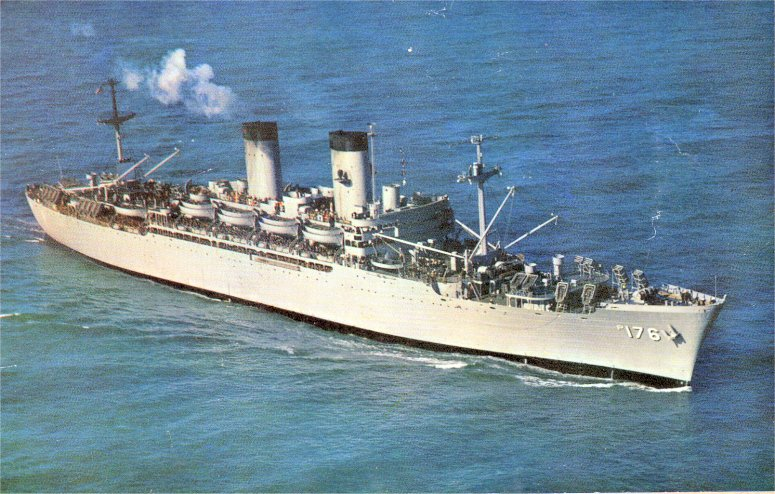
USS Breckinridge

On 28 October 1945 the 371st boarded the USS General J. C. Breckinridge (AP-176) and sailed at 1100 hours. The ship was a brand new troop ship at the time sailing on her 4th round trip from the United States to Europe. She was 622 feet long, displaced 19,500 tons, with a maximum speed of 20 knots, and carried a maximum of 6,000 troops. On this day the great ship carried 5,185 troops. Then, after crossing the Atlantic, the ship and unit arrived on 4 November 1945 in the port of Boston, Mass. Upon arriving in Boston, the unit boarded a train and went first to Camp Myles Standish, and then moved to Fort Devens, Massachusetts. On 8 November 1945, many of the troops were honorably discharged and began their journey home.
