= Gustav Koenigs =

German lawyer and civil servant

Gustav Hermann William August Koenigs (21 December 1882 – 15 April 1945) was a German lawyer and State Secretary of Transport during the Weimar period and the Third Reich. The conspirators of the 20 July plot planned for him to become Reich Transport Minister (German: Reichsverkehrsminister) had the coup d'état succeeded. He was arrested and released by the Gestapo and died in an airstrike toward the end of the Second World War.

== Education and early career ==
Gustav Koenigs was born in Düsseldorf. When his father became an official in the Prussian Ministry of Trade and Industry, the family moved to Berlin and he attended school in the district of Schöneberg. Koenigs followed in his father's profession, studying law at the universities of Freiburg im Breisgau, Bonn and Berlin. After completing his legal clerkship in 1909, he worked as a lawyer in the District of Blumenthal, in Düsseldorf, and in Nauen. He then was in various government positions including in the Prussian Interior Ministry from 1912 to 1914. From 1915 to 1919 he was a Regierungsrat (government councilor) in Düsseldorf. In 1920 he became Undersecretary in the department for waterways at the Prussian Ministry of Public Works.

== State Secretary ==
Koenigs transferred to the Reich Ministry of Transport (German: Reichsverkehrsministerium) and was promoted to head of the Department for Inland and Maritime transport on 1 April 1921. On 30 December 1931 he was promoted to State Secretary. At that time it was led by Theodor von Guérard. He retained his position under Guérard's successors, Gottfried Treviranus and Paul Freiherr von Eltz-Rübenach, remaining in office after the Nazi seizure of power on 30 January 1933. As early as 1933, Koenigs signed the first decrees directed against Jews and Social Democrats in the ministry. In the years that followed, the ministry lost some of its areas of responsibilities by outsourcing aviation to Hermann Göring's new Reich Ministry of Aviation and road construction to Fritz Todt as General Inspector for German Roads. During the Night of the Long Knives on 30 June 1934, the ministry's department head for shipping, who also headed Catholic Action, Erich Klausener, was murdered by the SS at his workplace. Koenigs, intimidated by this, asked Eltz-Rübenach to be relieved of his post but he was persuaded to remain in office.

In January 1935, Koenigs was elected President of the Board of Directors of the Deutsche Reichsbahn-Gesellschaft. In that year he was also appointed by Göring to the Prussian State Council. On 30 January 1937, Minister Eltz-Rübenach refused Adolf Hitler's award of the Golden Party Badge and was forced to resign. Hitler used this as an opportunity to take the Reichsbahn under the direct administration of the Reich. The Reichsbahn became part of the Reich Ministry of Transport, and Reichsbahn General Director Julius Dorpmüller became the new Minister of Transport. Wilhelm Kleinmann, Dorpmuller's deputy at the Reichsbahn who had joined the Party in 1931, took over the management of the railway department as the new "Senior State Secretary" while Koenigs, who was actually the senior, was left with the departments for shipping, hydraulic engineering and motor transport.

== Last years ==
In February 1940, Koenigs resigned as State Secretary. His position was not filled and State Secretary Kleinmann took over his departments. In Berlin, Koenigs had loose social contacts with conservative anti-Nazi plotters, such as Carl Friedrich Goerdeler, Ulrich von Hassell and Johannes Popitz. Goerdeler listed Koenigs as a possible transport minister or state secretary on one of his proposed cabinet lists, although it is unclear whether Koenigs was aware of this. After the failure of the 20 July plot, Koenigs was arrested by the Gestapo and held in Ravensbrück concentration camp until Christmas 1944. Shortly after his release, Koenigs died in an airstrike in Potsdam on 15 April 1945.

== Party membership ==
During the Weimar Republic, Koenigs was a member of the German People's Party (DVP) under Gustav Stresemann. After 1933, when opposition parties were banned, Koenig initially remained an independent but then joined the Nazi Party on 30 January 1938 (membership number 5,501,056).

== Sources ==
- Gottwaldt, Alfred; Schulle, Diana (2007). Juden ist die Benutzung von Speisewagen untersagt: Die Antijüdische Politik des Reichsverkehrsministeriums Zwischen 1933 und 1945 [Jews are Forbidden in the Dining Car: The anti-Jewish policy of the Reichsverkehrsministerium between 1933 and 1945]. Teetz: Hentrich & Hentrich. ISBN 978-3-938485-64-4.
- Lilla, Joachim (2005). Der Preußische Staatsrat 1921–1933: Ein biographisches Handbuch. Düsseldorf: Droste Verlag. ISBN 978-3-770-05271-4.
