= Walther Reinhardt =

German general

General der Infantrie Walther Reinhardt
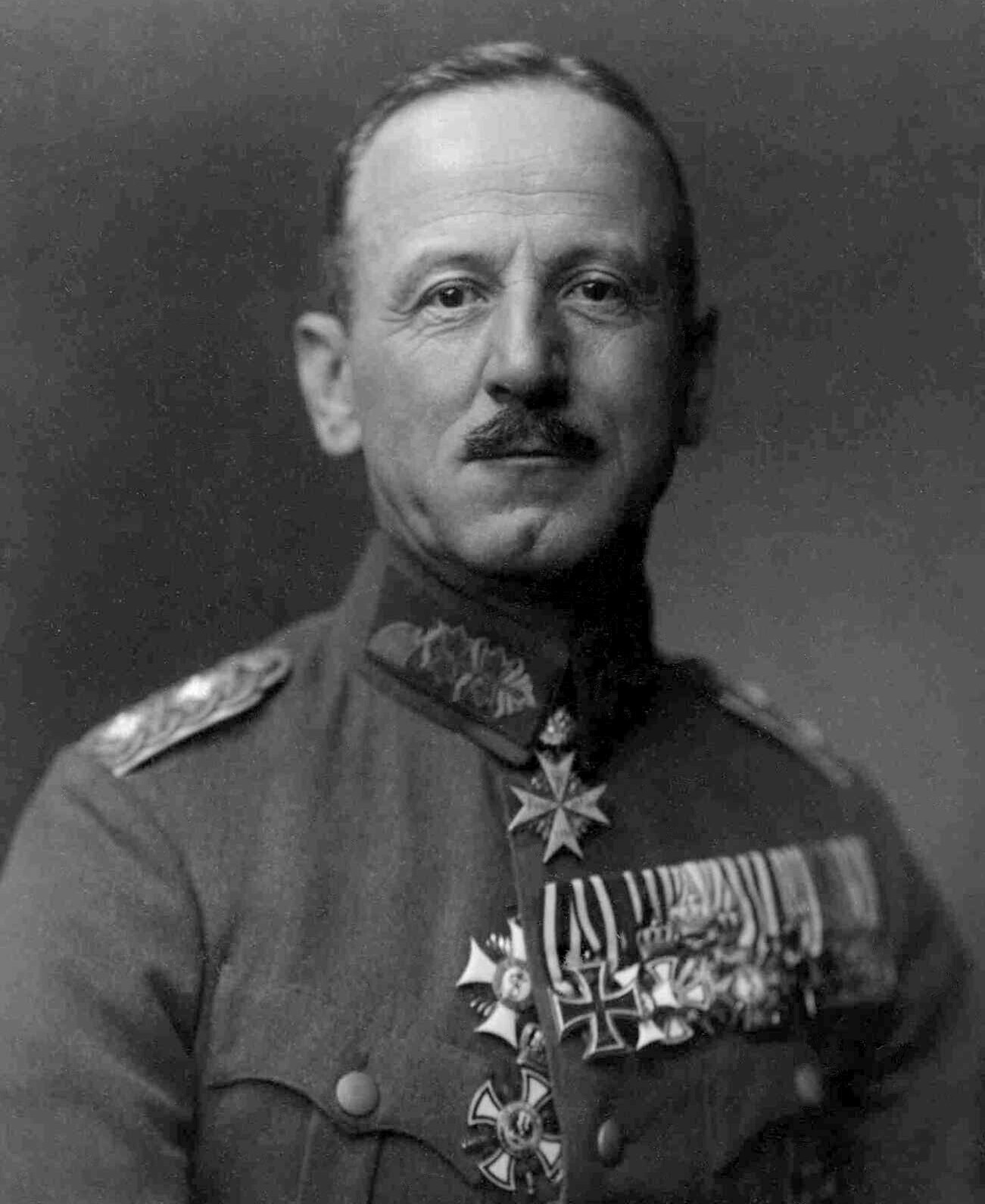
- General der Infanterie Walther Reinhardt in 1919

1st Chief of the German Army Command Weimar Republic
- In office 13 September 1919 – 26 March 1920
- President: Friedrich Ebert
- Chancellor: Gustav Bauer
- Preceded by: Position established
- Succeeded by: Hans von Seeckt

Prussian Minister of War German Empire
- In office 2 January 1919 – 13 September 1919
- President: Friedrich Ebert
- Chancellor: Philipp Scheidemann; Gustav Bauer
- Preceded by: Heinrich Scheuch
- Succeeded by: Position abolished

Personal details
- Born: 24 March 1872 Stuttgart, Kingdom of Württemberg, German Empire
- Died: 8 August 1930 (aged 58) Berlin, Free State of Prussia, Weimar Republic

Military service
- Allegiance: German Empire: Kingdom of Württemberg; Kingdom of Prussia; Weimar Republic
- Branch/service: Imperial German Army: Army of Württemberg (1892–1918); Prussian Army (1914–1918); Reichswehr: Reichsheer
- Years of service: 1892–1930
- Rank: General der Infantrie
- Battles/wars: World War I German Revolution of 1918-19
- Awards: Iron Cross, First Class; Iron Cross, Second Class; Pour le Mérite with Oak Leaves; Commander of the Royal House Order of Hohenzollern with Swords; Military Merit Order, 4th Class with Swords and Crown (Bavaria); Knight's Cross of theMilitary Merit Order (Württemberg)

Walther Gustav Reinhardt (German pronunciation: [ˈvaltɐ ˈʁaɪnhaʁt]; 24 March 1872 in Stuttgart – 8 August 1930 in Berlin) was a German officer who served as the last Prussian Minister of War and the first head of the army command (Chef der Heeresleitung) within the newly created Ministry of the Reichswehr of the Weimar Republic. During the Kapp Putsch of 1920, Reinhardt remained loyal to the elected government and was one of the few senior officers of the Reichswehr willing to order troops to fire at the revolting units.

== Early life and family ==
Reinhardt was born on 24 March 1872 in Stuttgart as the son of August von Reinhardt (1827–1907), a member of the Personenadel (lifelong, non-hereditary nobility) and officer of the Kingdom of Württemberg (Generalmajor and Commander of the 120th Infantry Regiment), and Emilie Reinhardt, née von Wiedenmann. His brother Ernst (1870-1939) also became an officer (Generalleutnant) and was the father of Hellmuth Reinhardt (1900–89, Generalmajor).

In 1900, Walther Reinhardt married Luise Fürbringer in Berlin. They had three daughters.

== Military career and World War I ==
After his time as a Kadett (cadet), Reinhardt joined the grenadier regiment "Königin Olga" (1st Württembergisches) Nr. 119 in 1891 as a Fähnrich. Once he had finished training as a general staff officer, he was sent to the Großer Generalstab in 1901 and served there with some short interruptions until 1918.

During World War I, Reinhardt first served in 1914–16 at the staff of the XIII Army Corps (Western Front), then as chief of staff at 11th Army in Macedonia (1916/17) and 7th Army in France (1917/18). For his actions during the German spring offensive and subsequent battles in the summer of 1918 he received the highest decorations for bravery of the Kingdom of Württemberg and the Kingdom of Prussia.

== Rise to Leadership of Reichswehr ==
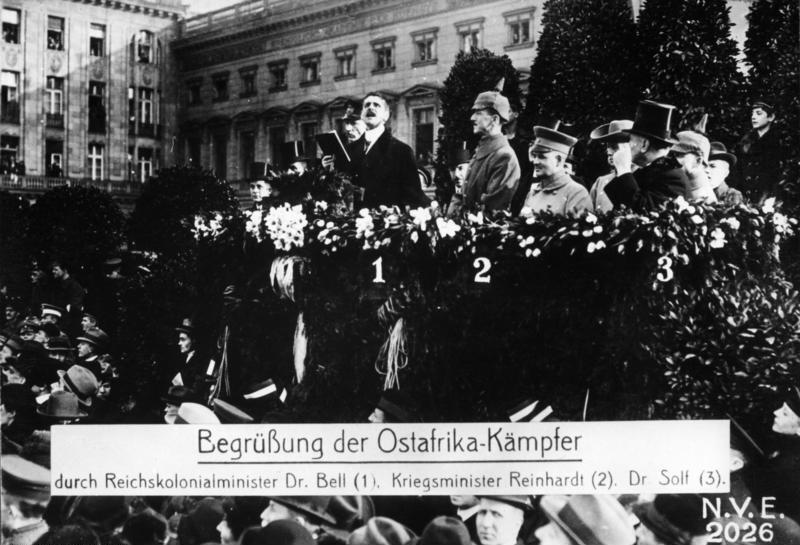
Walther Reinhardt (2) at a welcoming ceremony for German soldiers returned from the hostilities in German East Africa, Berlin on 3 March 1919

In early November 1918, Reinhardt, at the time in the rank of Oberst (colonel), became Leiter der Demobilmachung (head of demobilisation) at the Prussian Ministry of War. When the revolution erupted in Berlin, Reinhardt organised the protection of the Reichskanzlei and won the special trust of Friedrich Ebert, the new head of government. On 2 January 1919, Reinhardt was appointed Prussian Minister of War (as it would turn out as the last person to hold that post). He accepted the position on condition that the Council of the People's Deputies, the revolutionary government since 10 November 1918, would back the authority of traditional officers against the rival system of soldiers' councils that had emerged in the revolution. In return, he was willing to accept superficial concessions to revolutionary ideas like replacing epaulettes with simple stripes on the sleeves.

As Prussian Minister of War, Reinhardt became part of the cabinet of Philipp Scheidemann that took office on 13 February 1919, replacing the Council of the People's Deputies. However, he just had a seat but no vote in cabinet meetings. In March 1919, the Gesetz über die Bildung einer vorläufigen Reichswehr (law setting up a provisional military) came into force, making provisional president Friedrich Ebert the commander-in-chief of the armed forces with the minister of defence exercising the right of command. However, the Prussian forces were excluded from this and remained under Reinhardt's command.

Reinhardt was strongly opposed to signing the Treaty of Versailles and advocated the resumption of military resistance. In fact, in the spring and summer of 1919 Reinhardt was one of the main proponents of the Oststaat plan that called for a temporary secession of Germany's eastern provinces. The idea was to take military action against the territorial designs of Poland outside of the restraints imposed by the armistice on the Reich. Although the German army at the time had superior forces in the area, they were unable to put them into the field due to pressure from the Allies who had designated the Polish government part of the Entente. After the integrity of the eastern provinces would have been restored, there were medium term plans for a "national uprising" restoring unity with the Reich under a more conservative and militaristic system than the one prevailing in early 1919. Opposition from the government, especially Minister of Defence Gustav Noske, and the OHL, notably Wilhelm Groener, prevented the plan from being put into practice. However, many others in the cabinet shared Reinhardt's opposition to the treaty and in the end the government resigned over the issue in June 1919. Its replacement, led by Gustav Bauer did, however, sign the treaty.

In the summer of 1919, the administration and command structures of the German armed forces were completely restructured. The Oberste Heeresleitung was dissolved in early July. Paul von Hindenburg and Wilhelm Groener, the highest-ranking officers, both resigned. In August, the Weimar Constitution came into force and Minister of Defence Noske became commander in chief of the new Reichswehr. The existing War Ministries of the individual German states (Bavaria, Saxony, Württemberg and Prussia) were dissolved or integrated into the new Reichswehrministerium in Berlin. On 13 September, the position of Prussian Minister of War was abolished and Reinhardt became commander of the Reichswehrstelle Preußen on 1 October. He expanded this position into that of Chef der Heeresleitung, the highest-ranking military position within the landforces. He was promoted to General Major. Reinhardt's main tasks now became reducing the army's troop strength to 100,000 in accordance with the Treaty of Versailles and reorganising the army.

== Kapp-Lüttwitz-Putsch and resignation ==
When Freikorps and regular troops followed orders given by General Walther von Lüttwitz on 13 March 1920 to march on the centre of Berlin, occupy the government buildings and depose the legitimate government, Defence Minister Noske called a meeting of senior military staff in his office at the Bendlerblock. As their commander he asked them to defend the government buildings but was turned down. Reinhardt was one of only two officers who were willing to follow an order to shoot at the revolting troops. Some of the others suggested negotiations, others claimed that the troops would not understand an order to fire, some argued that the regular units would not be able to defeat putschists. General Hans von Seeckt, head of the Truppenamt (the institution that served as the general staff, after the Treaty of Versailles had mandated the general staff to be dissolved) and after Reinhardt the second-most senior officer present, spoke about comradeship with the putschists. Although he had argued for the Oststaat plan, Reinhardt was loyal to the Ebert/Bauer government and willing to fight for it. However, as Chef der Heeresleitung he had no troops under his direct command.

Left defenceless, the government had to flee from the capital. However, the putsch was crippled by a refusal of the bureaucracy to cooperate and by a general strike that paralyzed the country. The putsch collapsed within days. However, many in Noske's own party, the Social Democratic Party of Germany (SPD), and in the unions felt that Noske had not done enough to stop the putsch. They called for his resignation. On 22 March 1920, Noske resigned. Out of loyalty to Noske, Reinhardt resigned with him. He was replaced as Chef der Heeresleitung by General von Seeckt.

== Later life ==
Although he resigned then as Chef der Heeresleitung, Reinhardt remained an active officer. From 1920 to 1924 he was in charge of the Wehrkreis V (Stuttgart). In 1923, Reinhardt was endowed with executive power and tasked with suppressing the left-wing uprising during the Reichsexekution against Thuringia (reestablishing the central government's authority by force of arms). At the beginning of 1925, as General der Infanterie he took command of Gruppenkommando 2 at Kassel. He was discharged from active service at his own request at the end of 1927. However, he remained involved in training general officers by organising the so-called Reinhardt-Kurse. These were lectures at the university and the Hochschule für Politik in Berlin for selected officers, aimed at providing them with a broader perspective than that offered by a narrowly military education. Although personally loyal to the Republic, he continued to oppose the military disarmament imposed by the Treaty of Versailles and published writings aimed at improving the ability of the German youth to put up a fight.

He died in Berlin-Lichterfelde on 8 August 1930.

== Decorations and awards ==
- Iron Cross of 1914, 1st and 2nd class
- Pour le Mérite with Oak Leaves
- Order of the Red Eagle, 4th class
- Commander of the Royal House Order of Hohenzollern with Swords
- Cross of Honour 2nd class of the Princely House Order of Hohenzollern with Swords
- Military Merit Order, 4th class with swords and crown (Bavaria)
- Officer's Cross of the Albert Order with Swords
- Knight's Cross of the Military Merit Order (Württemberg)
- Cross of Honour of the Order of the Crown (Württemberg)
- Commander 2nd class of the Friedrich Order
- Service award, 1st class (Württemberg)
- General Honour Decoration for Bravery (Hesse)
- Hanseatic Cross of Hamburg
- War Merit Cross, 1st class (Brunswick)
- Hanseatic Cross of Bremen
- Knight's Cross, First Class of the Ducal Saxe-Ernestine House Order with Swords
- Ottoman War Medal ("Iron Crescent")
- Commander of the Order of Military Merit (Bulgaria)

== Works (posthumously) ==
- Wehrkraft und Wehrwille. Aus dem Nachlaß mit einer Lebensbeschreibung. ("Military Strength and Military Will - From the estate with a biography") Edited by Ernst Reinhardt, 1932.

== Bibliography ==
- William Mulligan: The creation of the modern German Army: General Walther Reinhardt and the Weimar Republic, 1914–1930. Berghahn Books, 2005. ISBN 1-57181-908-8.
