= Albert Ganzenmüller =

German Nazi politician

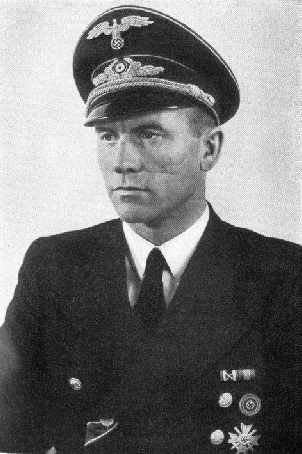
- Born: 25 February 1905; Passau, Germany
- Died: 20 March 1996 (aged 91); Munich, Germany
- Military career
- Allegiance: Nazi Germany
- Branch: Sturmabteilung
- Rank: SA-Standartenführer
- Awards: Knight's Cross of the War Merit

Albert Ganzenmüller (born 25 February 1905 in Passau – died 20 March 1996 in Munich) was a German Nazi and, as the State Secretary at the Reich Transport Ministry (Reichsverkehrsministerium), was involved in the deportation of German Jews. Under Ganzenmüller's command, around three million were transported to their deaths by the Reichsbahn and at least 600,000 people were deported to several concentration camps between 1942 and 1943.

== Career ==
Albert Ganzenmüller had taken part in the Munich Beer Hall Putsch in November 1923 while still at Realgymnasium (secondary high school). Afterwards, he became a holder of the Blood Order of the German Nazi Party. After graduating from the Technical College in Munich (now the Technical University of Munich), where he was a member of a student fraternity known as the Corps Rheno-Palatia München, he became an executive with the Deutsche Reichsbahn (German State Railways) in 1931 and joined the Nazi Party and the Sturmabteilung (SA or “brownshirts”). In 1940, he had reached the rank of SA-Standartenführer on the staff of the Supreme SA Leadership. He held a Doctor of Engineering degree.

In 1934, Ganzenmüller became a senior railway executive (Reichsbahn-Rat) in Munich and in 1938 was appointed Senior Government Adviser (Oberregierungsrat). He was subsequently head (Dezernent) of electrical engineering at the central office of the German State Railways in Munich. In 1940, he took over the repair and renewal of the electric railway network in occupied France. The following year, at his own request, he was transferred to the Eastern Division at Poltava in central Ukraine.

Ganzenmüller quickly restored railroad traffic between Minsk and Smolensk. On the recommendation of Albert Speer in May 1942, Ganzenmüller succeeded Wilhelm Kleinmann as Deputy General Director of the German State Railways and State Secretary at the Reich Transport Ministry under Dr. Julius Dorpmüller.

== Involvement in deportations ==
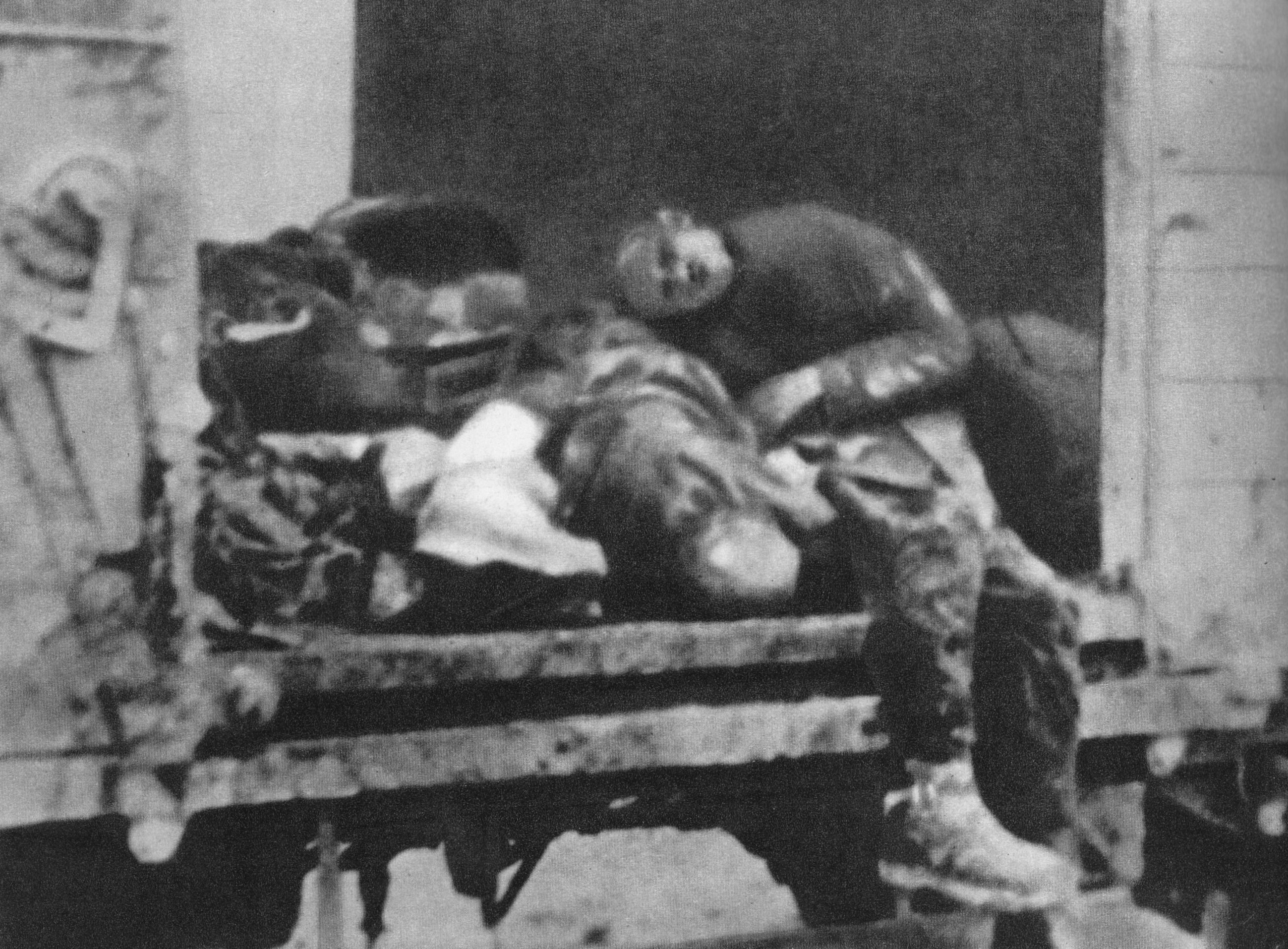
Corpses of Jews from the Warsaw Ghetto who died inside sealed boxcars of the Reichsbahn before reaching Treblinka extermination camp, August 1942

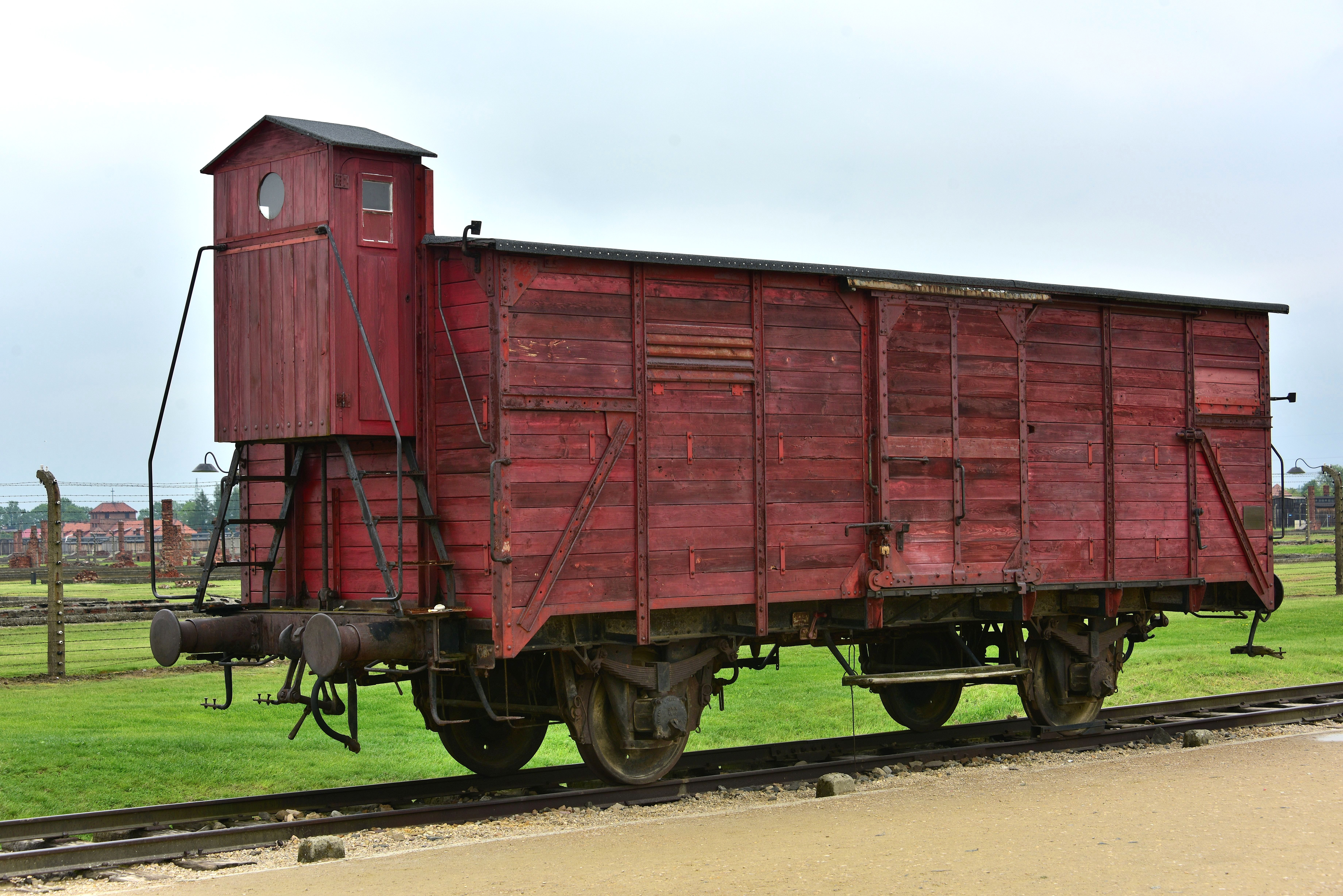
A sealed boxcar of the Reichsbahn at Auschwitz-Birkenau extermination camp

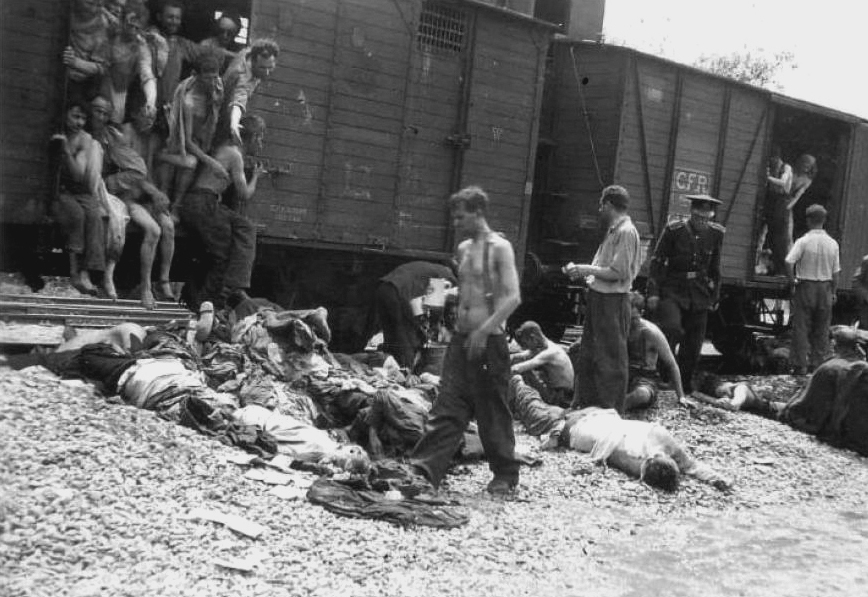
Removing corpses from death train from Romania

Ganzenmüller was immediately involved in the organization of trains for deportation. He collaborated in the transportation scheme for elderly German Jews to Theresienstadt and ensured the smooth running of transport to the extermination camps set up under Operation Reinhardt. On 16 July 1942, Karl Wolff, the Personal Adjutant to Heinrich Himmler, complained to the newly appointed State Secretary about irregular transport and track repairs on the line to the extermination camp at Sobibor. Ganzenmüller replied in writing on 28 July 1942 as follows:

A train carrying 5,000 Jews has run daily since 22 July from Warsaw to Treblinka via Malkinia; furthermore, another train has run twice a week with 5,000 Jews from Przemysl to Belzec. The senior management of the eastern division of the railways, ‘Gedob’ (Generaldirektion der Ostbahnen), is in constant touch with the security service (Sicherheitsdienst) in Krakau. The latter is in agreement that transport from Warsaw to Sobibor via Lublin should continue while the reconstruction work on this stretch renders such movements impossible ([until] approximately October 1942.

Karl Wolff thanked him on 13 August 1942 in a personal letter:

… I note with particular pleasure from your communication that a train with 5,000 members of the chosen race has been running daily for 14 days and that we are accordingly in a position to continue with this population movement at an accelerated pace. […]

At the beginning of 1943, Himmler approached Ganzenmüller directly in order to ensure the pending “removal of Jews” to the Auschwitz concentration camp. Most of the victims were carried to their deaths by Reichsbahn trains in locked and windowless cattle wagons, with few sanitary arrangements and little or nothing in the way of water or food. The wagons were supposed to carry just 50 persons but were normally packed with 100 to 150 victims, the overcrowding making sitting impossible and increasing their distress. The Holocaust trains were hired by Adolf Eichmann, and the Reichsbahn demanded one-way fares be paid by the victims, although children below the age of four were allowed free travel to their deaths. The trains traveled to local death camps in German-occupied Poland at Chelmno, Belzec, Treblinka, Majdanek and Auschwitz-Birkenau, but the early trains in 1939 and 1940 also traveled to Nazi ghettos in the east, and the victims were usually murdered there by Einsatzgruppen organized by Reinhard Heydrich. Conditions on the Holocaust trains were so bad that many passengers died en route to the death camps especially as it often took many days to reach their destinations. The cattle cars in which the victims were carried were completely unheated in winter and unventilated in hot weather and so the passengers were exposed to either hypothermia or heat stroke. Deaths among the elderly, children, and sick were common. To maintain the deception, some passengers were given postcards by the guards to send to their relatives with dictated words about their successful "resettlement". That deception continued even to the death camps, such as with a bogus station at Treblinka and Sobibor camps that was complete with signs and flower tubs to reassure the victims who debouched there.

== Postwar ==
Ganzenmüller escaped to Argentina via Italy from the interrogation camp in 1945. His denazification process was delayed, and in 1952 an amnesty led to the ending of the case against him. He returned to Germany in 1955 and was employed as a planning engineer for transport matters by Hoesch AG. The public prosecutor's office continued to investigate him after 1957, as the exchange of correspondence with Wolff and Himmler had been discovered and published by the historian Gerald Reitlinger. Ganzenmüller remained on remand for ten weeks, but the investigations led only to a preferred charge. In 1973, a case was brought by the regional court at Düsseldorf. The charge was that by organising transport, the 68-year-old Ganzenmüller had aided and abetted the murder of millions of Jewish men, women and children whose wrongful detention had resulted in death. The case was provisionally halted in 1973 because of his inability to follow the case and being declared "mentally unfit" after suffering a heart attack. The case was terminated altogether in 1977. Ganzenmüller died on 20 March 1996.

== Awards and decorations ==
- Knight's Cross of the War Merit Cross with Swords (19 September 1943)
- Blood Order number 1411933 (1933)

== See also ==
- Julius Dorpmüller, Reich Transport Minister in 1945
- Sonderzüge in den Tod, a touring exhibition, 2008
- Holocaust trains

== Bibliography ==
- Raul Hilberg: Sonderzüge nach Auschwitz. Mainz 1981, ISBN 3-921426-18-9
- Heiner Lichtenstein: Mit der Reichsbahn in den Tod: Massentransporte in den Holocaust 1941–1945. Köln 1985, ISBN 3-7663-0809-2 (Prozess S. 120–130)
- Alfred Gottwaldt, Diana Schulle: „Juden ist die Benutzung von Speisewagen untersagt“: Die antijüdische Politik des Reichsverkehrsministeriums zwischen 1933 und 1945; Forschungsgutachten. Teetz 2007, ISBN 978-3-938485-64-4 (bes. S. 105–112)
