= Reich Ministry of Transport =

Agency of the German government, 1919–1945

- Reichsverkehrsministerium (RVM) (German)
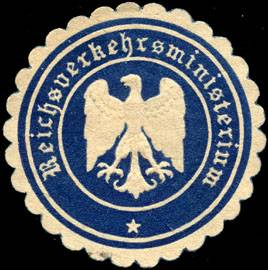
- RVM official sealing stamp prior to 1935

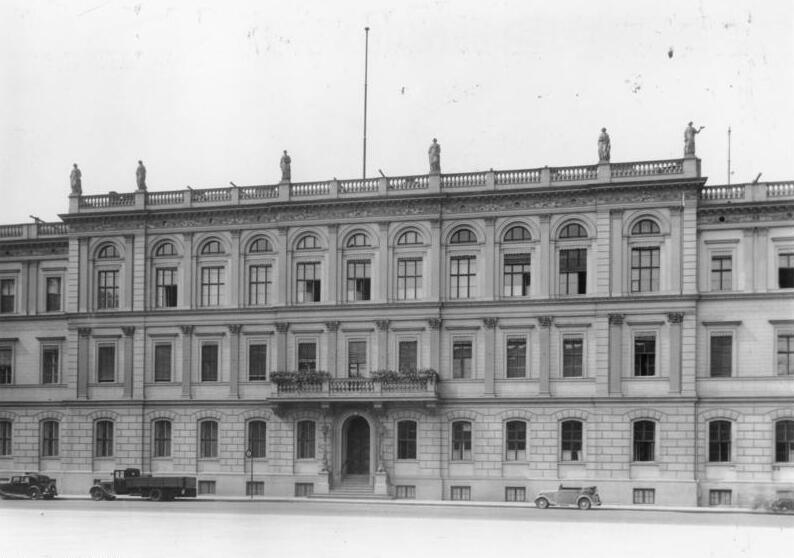
- RVM headquarters in Berlin, 1937

Agency overview
- Formed: March 13, 1919
- Preceding agency: Ministry of Public Works (Prussia)
- Dissolved: May 23, 1945
- Superseding agencies: Allied Control Council (1945–49); Federal Ministry of Transport (1949–)
- Jurisdiction: Government of the Weimar Republic (until 1934); Government of Nazi Germany (from 1934)
- Headquarters: Voßstraße 34/35, Wilhelmplatz, Berlin-Mitte; 52°30′38″N 13°22′58″E
- Employees: 1.5 Million (1943)
- Minister responsible: Reichsminister
- Agency executive: State Secretary
- Child agencies: VdV (1934); Deutsche Reichsbahn (1937); * BBÖ (1938); * ČSD (1938); * PKP (1939); * Luxembourg Railways (1941); * JDŽ-JДЖ (parts) (1941); * СЖД (parts) (1941)

The Reich Ministry of Transport (German: Reichsverkehrsministerium, RVM) was a cabinet-level agency of the German government from 1919 until 1945, operating during the Weimar Republic and Nazi Germany. Formed from the Prussian Ministry of Public Works after the end of World War I, the RVM was in charge of regulating German railways, roadways, waterways, and the construction industry - a kind of infrastructure agency in today's understanding. In the 1920s, the Ministry's involvement in the rail sector was limited to administrative and technical supervisory functions. The National Railway (Deutsche Reichsbahn) was initially organized as an independent state-owned company to guarantee that Germany paid war reparations according to the provisions of the 1924 Dawes Plan.

Under Nazi control, the Transport Ministry expanded exponentially. The Reichsbahn, which had become Germany's largest public asset and also the largest such enterprise in the capitalist world at the time, was taken over by the RVM in 1937. Railroads in the German states, transportation associations, and even private transport companies also came under the Nazi government's direct control through the Ministry. During World War II the RVM took over agencies in conquered nations and provided military rail transport. It also became responsible for the deportation of European Jews to extermination camps. The particular unit involved, "No. 21. Bulk Transport", functioned in close cooperation with the SS. The RVM therefore came to play a pivotal role in The Holocaust. The Ministry lived on for a time after the war in the Flensburg Government and was dissolved de facto at the end of May, 1945.

The Ministry's headquarters were located in central Berlin on the Wilhelmplatz. Over time it came to occupy a complex of buildings, including underground air-raid shelters built in 1940. Heavily damaged by Allied bombing, the site wound up in East Berlin in 1949. Portions of it served as the East German Railway headquarters until German Reunification in 1990. Most of the site was left derelict and was demolished in 2012. A large shopping mall was built in its place in 2014, with two small wings historically preserved.

== Weimar Republic (1919–1932) ==
The new Reich cabinet established the RVM on October 1, 1919. By the beginning of 1932, the RVM was operating five departments each headed by directors:

Reich Ministry of Transport organizational structure at the beginning of 1932
Department			Director
No.	German name	English name	Director
E I	Eisenbahn-Verwaltungsabteilung	Railroad Administration	Eduard Vogel
E II	Eisenbahntechnische Abteilung	Railway Technical Division	Karl Knaut
L	Luftfahrt	Aviation	Ernst Brandenburg
K	Kraftverkehr und Schifffahrt	Motor Transport and Shipping	Ulrich Stapenhorst
W	Wasserbautechnik	Hydraulic engineering	Johannes Gährs

== Nazi Germany (1933–1945) ==
=== Early Period ===
After the Nazi seizure of power in January 1933, among the first steps in National Socialist policy was the removal of all "non-Aryans" from the civil service. The Transport Ministry became subject to the "Law for the Restoration of the Professional Civil Service" on April 7, 1933. As a result, all Jewish employees and political opponents were dismissed or forced to retire. Civil servants already employed in 1914 or who had fought at the front in World War I were initially spared. The Reichsbahn, which would not come under formal government authority until 1937, was not obliged to apply the law. However, it implemented the measure anyway, with exceptions granted for employees whose technical skills were thought indispensable.

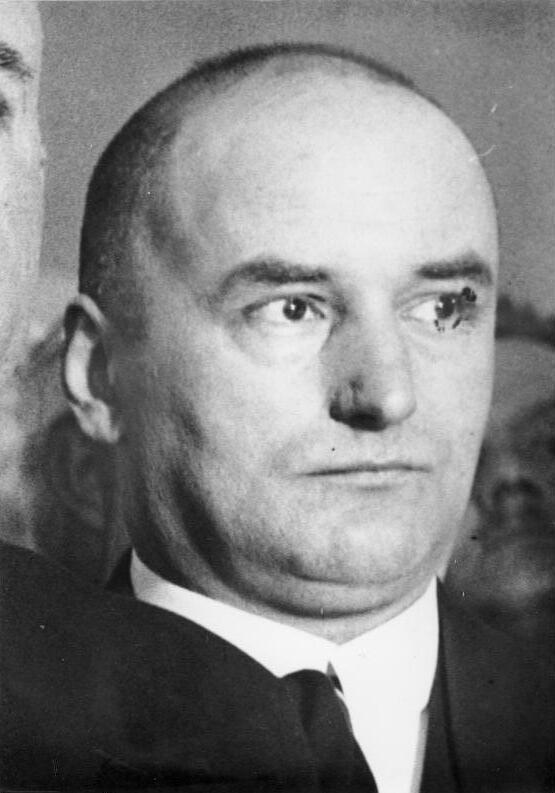
RVM Director of Maritime Shipping Erich Klausener in 1933, one year before his assassination in the Night of the Long Knives

RVM organization also changed during this period. The aviation department was transferred to the Reich Air Ministry, established under Hermann Göring on May 5, 1933. The Motor Transport and Shipping Department was rearranged when Ulrich Stapenhorst left to take up the position of District President of Hannover. Former aviation head Ernst Brandenburg took over Motor Transport and Erich Klausener was appointed Director of Maritime Shipping. The RVM remained sidelined from construction of the largest single Nazi transportation project: the Autobahn. In July 1933, Fritz Todt was directly appointed by Adolf Hitler to build the huge road system quickly, and Transport Minister Paul Freiherr von Eltz-Rübenach thought it prudent not to complain at this obvious bypass of his authority. As was typical of regime, policies were fractured between strong personalities in differing agencies, creating both vertical and horizontal conflicts.

On 24 June 1934, Maritime Director Klausener delivered a passionate speech at the Catholic Congress in Berlin that was critical of Nazi repression of the church. Viewed as an open challenge to the regime, Klausener was shot inside the Ministry building six days later during the Night of the Long Knives. SS officer Kurt Gildisch, who carried out the assassination on the direct orders of Reinhard Heydrich, was promoted in rank to SS-Sturmbannführer. The act also served to intimidate remaining critics of the regime at the Ministry into silence. Max Waldeck was appointed in Klausener's place. During this period the RVM was organized as follows:

Reich Ministry of Transport organizational structure, 1933–37
Department			Director
No.	German name	English name	Director
E I	Eisenbahn-Verwaltungsabteilung	Railroad Administration	Eduard Vogel
E II	Eisenbahntechnische Abteilung	Railway Technical Division	Karl Knaut
K	Kraftverkehr	Motor Transport	Ernst Brandenburg
S	Schifffahrt	Shipping	Erich Klausener (1933–34); Max Waldeck (after 1934)
W	Wasserbautechnik	Hydraulic engineering	Johannes Gährs

=== Gleichschaltung and the Reichsbahn merger ===
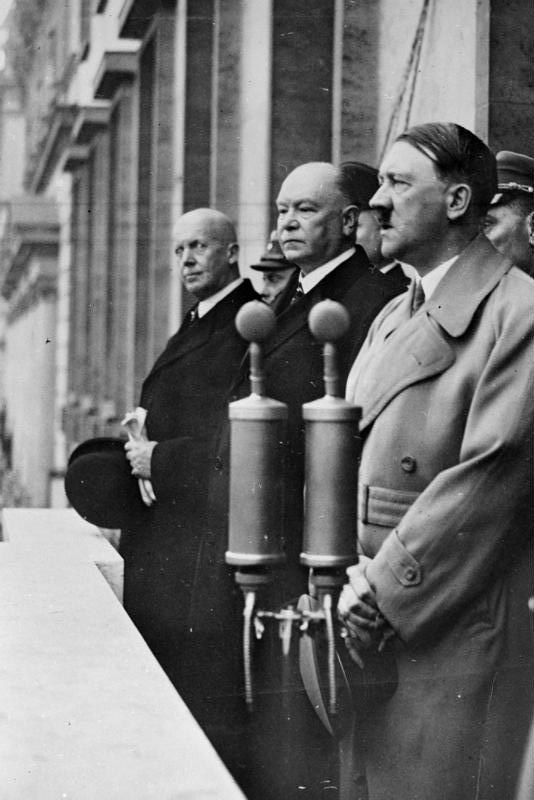
Julius Dorpmüller stands next to Hitler on the balcony of the Reich Chancellery on February 4, 1937, at his appointment as Reich Transport Minister

Between mid-1933 and 1937 the Reich government instituted the policy of Gleichschaltung, loosely translated as "synchronization" or "bringing into line." This was a process by which the state began establishing totalitarian control over all aspects of the public sector. A primary example of this occurred in 1934, when the RVM took over the Association of German Transport Authorities (German: Verband Deutscher Verkehrsverwaltungen), effectively stripping all independent transport-related trade associations and non-governmental organizations of their influence.

The apex of this process occurred at a cabinet meeting on January 30, 1937. Adolf Hitler declared the "Law for the Reorganization of Relations between the Reichsbank and the Reichsbahn", effectively placing the bank and railroads under the regime's direct authority. Ostensibly the law's purpose was to eliminate "foreign influence" from key national infrastructure; in reality it was about the dismissal of remaining Jews and political opponents, as well as the filling of positions with reliable Nazis. During the meeting Hitler also used the occasion of the 4th anniversary of the seizure of power to offer a Golden Party Badge to those ministers who were still not NSDAP members. Transport Minister Paul Freiherr von Eltz-Rübenach, a devout Catholic, explicitly declined the award to protest the rising conflict between the government and the Church. Hitler was outraged and Eltz-Rübenach was immediately forced to resign, becoming a "suspect person" closely monitored by the Gestapo.

Reichsbahn General Director Julius Dorpmüller was then appointed Transport Minister and its board of directors was transferred to the RVM on February 2, 1937. The Ministry grew enormously in size and existing department heads were given the rank of Ministerial Director. A further adjustment to Ministry occurred under the Reichsbahn Act of July 11, 1939, wherein the Transport Minister retained the role of Director General of the National Railway by the simple virtue of his office. Dorpmüller now controlled the entire national infrastructure, but saw himself as an apolitical technocrat and did not join the Nazi Party even though it would have been advantageous to do so. The chancellery later ordered his induction into the party and he was informed of the fact by the party treasurer.

Reich Ministry of Transport organizational structure, 1937–1945
Department			Ministerial Director	State Secretary
No.	German name	English name	Ministerial Director	State Secretary
E I	Verkehrs- und Tarifabteilung	Rail Transport and Tariff	Paul Treibe	Wilhelm Kleinmann (1937–1942) Albert Ganzenmüller (1942–1945)
E II	Betriebs- und Bauabteilung	Operational Management and Construction	Max Leibbrand	Wilhelm Kleinmann (1937–1942) Albert Ganzenmüller (1942–1945)
E III	Maschinentechnische und Einkaufsabteilung	Mechanical Engineering and Purchasing	Werner Bergmann	Wilhelm Kleinmann (1937–1942) Albert Ganzenmüller (1942–1945)
E IV	Finanz- und Rechtsabteilung	Finance and Law	Alfred Prang	Wilhelm Kleinmann (1937–1942) Albert Ganzenmüller (1942–1945)
E V	Eisenbahntechnische Abteilung	Railway Engineering	Hermann Osthoff	Wilhelm Kleinmann (1937–1942) Albert Ganzenmüller (1942–1945)
E VI*	Eisenbahn-Bauabteilung (1939–1945)	Railroad Construction	Willy Meilicke	Wilhelm Kleinmann (1937–1942) Albert Ganzenmüller (1942–1945)
E VII*	Eisenbahn-Bauabteilung (1940–1942)	Railroad Construction	Willy Meilicke	Wilhelm Kleinmann (1937–1942) Albert Ganzenmüller (1942–1945)
Group A	Allgemeine Gruppe für Personalfragen der höheren Beamten, internationale Angelegenheiten, Kabinettsangelegenheiten, Propaganda	General Group for personnel questions of senior officials, international affairs, cabinet affairs, propaganda	Theodor Kittel	Wilhelm Kleinmann (1937–1942) Albert Ganzenmüller (1942–1945)
Group L	Landesverteidigung und Eisenbahnwehrmachtliche Angelegenheiten	National Defense and Military Railway Affairs	Friedrich Ebeling	Wilhelm Kleinmann (1937–1942) Albert Ganzenmüller (1942–1945)
K	Kraftverkehr	Motor Transport	Ernst Brandenburg	Gustav Koenigs (1935–1940) Paul Wülfing von Ditten (1940–1945)
S I	See- und Binnenschifffahrt	Maritime and Inland Waterways Shipping	Max Waldeck	Gustav Koenigs (1935–1940) Paul Wülfing von Ditten (1940–1945)
S II*	Verbindung Seeschifffahrt-Marine (1940–1945)	Navy-Maritime Shipping Laison	Max Waldeck	Gustav Koenigs (1935–1940) Paul Wülfing von Ditten (1940–1945)
W	Wasserbautechnik	Hydraulic Engineering	Johannes Gährs	Gustav Koenigs (1935–1940) Paul Wülfing von Ditten (1940–1945)

*Additional departments set up in wartime

=== World War II ===
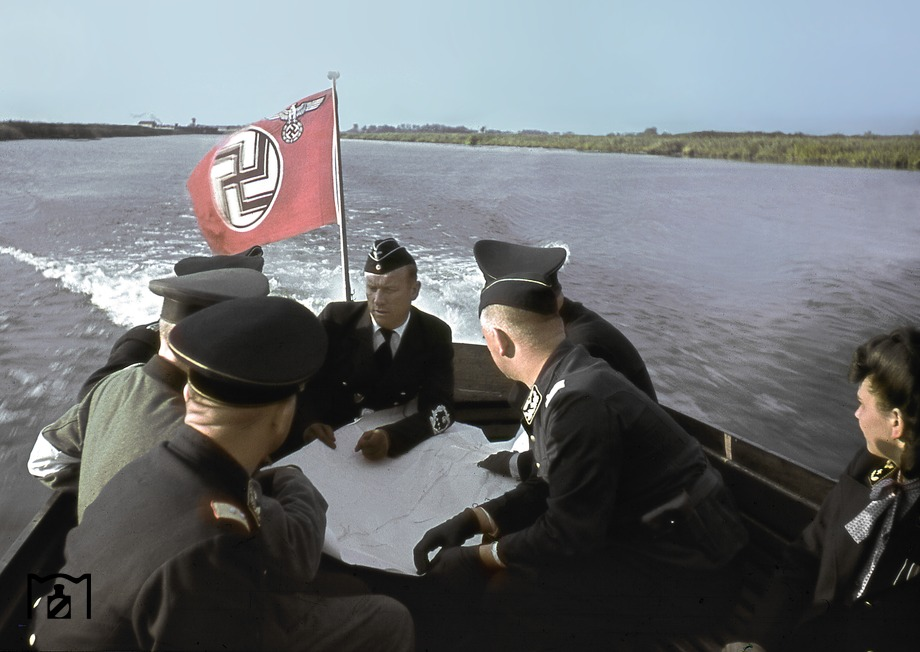
RVM State Secretary Albert Ganzenmüller (Center, with map) overseeing the construction of a railway bridge with his staff on the Dnieper River, Russia, July 1943.

The Transport Ministry's structure and leadership changed only slightly during the war. A new railway construction department E VI was established in 1939 under Willy Meilicke, split off from department E II. In 1940 it was further reinforced by a second building department, E VII, as the expansion of the Reich and wartime demands reached their peak. After the forced retirement of maritime State Secretary Gustav Koenigs in 1940, his responsibilities were transferred to Paul Wülfing von Ditten. The Department of Maritime and Inland Shipping was split into Economic (full name in German: Wirtschaftliche Führung der Seefahrt) and Naval divisions.

On 4 November 1939, one month after the defeat of Poland, the western part of Second Polish Republic was incorporated into Germany and its infrastructure taken over by the RVM. Southeastern Poland was organized into the General Government under Hans Frank, a logistically distinct entity centered in Kraków. The Polish State Railways in this area were organized into the General Directorate of the Eastern Railway (German: Generaldirecktion der Ostbahn or Gedob or Ostbahn), financially and operationally separate from the Reichsbahn.

German policy in the occupied countries of the west were much different. The invasion of Norway and Denmark in April, 1940, placed little burden on the RVM as those countries were allowed to run their railroads as before. On 1 August 1940, after the victory in the West, the Belgian, Dutch and French national railways were returned to local control under German "observation", except in coastal areas where all transport remained with the Wehrmacht. Luxembourg was the exception. On November 1, 1941, the Grand Duchy of Luxembourg was annexed by Germany and its entire infrastructure, including all privately owned railways, were turned over to the Transport Ministry.

From 1942 to 1944, the primary task of the RVM was supporting the German war economy and supplying the enormous needs of the Wehrmacht on the Eastern Front. The faltering situation in the East began presenting critical transport problems as early as January, 1942. Army Group Center, which alone required 75 supply trains per day, in actuality received only 25 to 40. At the request of Julius Dorpmüller, Hitler ordered the Ostbahn be subordinated to the RVM on 4 January 1942 with a special branch office: Zweigstelle Osten des Reichsverkehrsministeriums. The RVM thus expanded further and became responsible for all rail operations in occupation zones behind army field rail commands.

=== The Holocaust ===
In early 1940, a new unit was commissioned in the RVM Rail Operations Department E II: No. 21 Massenbeförderung or "Mass Transport". It was responsible for the organization and timetables of special trains deporting Jews from Germany and the occupied territories, working closely with the SS Reich Security Main Office. Following the Wannsee Conference in 1942, transports also began running directly to the extermination camps. As a result, the RVM became responsible for a substantial part of The Holocaust and was an essential component that made its full scale possible.

There is no record that Minister Dorpmüller ever considered the moral implications of this. So long as the Reichsbahn maintained its internal autonomy, he served whatever transport requirements the regime demanded. He was considered one-dimensional, only interested in running railroads. US Army interrogations shortly after the war assigned little or no personal responsibility to RVM employees. The US further determined that, with limited exceptions, the personnel held only "lukewarm" connections to the Nazi Party. Americans were far more concerned with retaining key staff to rebuild Germany, stating employees were "very cooperative and anxious to help in the reconstruction of the German Railway System."

== List of Reich transport ministers (1919–1945) ==
Political party: Centre SPD DDP DVP DNVP BVP KVP NSDAP None

Portrait	Name (Birth–Death)	Term of office			Political party	Cabinet
Portrait	Name (Birth–Death)	Took office	Left office	Duration	Political party	Cabinet
	Johannes Bell (1868–1949)	Feb 13, 1919	May 1, 1920	77 days	Centre Party	Scheidemann; Bauer; Müller I
	Gustav Bauer; 1870–1944	May 2, 1920	Jun 21, 1920	50 days	Social Democratic Party (SPD)	Müller I
	Wilhelm Groener (1867–1939)	Jun 25, 1920	Aug 12, 1923	3 years, 48 days	Non-partisan	Fehrenbach; Wirth I Wirth II; Cuno
	Rudolf Oeser (1858–1926)	Aug 13, 1923	Oct 11, 1924	1 year, 59 days	German Democratic Party (DDP)	Stresemann I Stresemann II^{[1]} Marx I Marx II
	Rudolf Krohne (1876–1953)	Oct 12, 1924	Dec 17, 1926	2 years, 66 days	German People's Party (DVP)	Luther I Luther II^{[2]} Marx III
	Wilhelm Koch (1877–1950)	Jan 28, 1927	Jun 12, 1928	1 year, 136 days	German National People's Party (DNVP)	Marx IV
	Theodor von Guérard (1) (1863 – 1943)	Jun 27, 1928	Feb 6, 1929	224 days	Centre Party	Müller II
	Georg Schätzel (1874–1934)	Feb 7, 1929	Apr 12, 1929	64 days	Bavarian People's Party (BVP)	Müller II
	Adam Stegerwald (1874–1945)	Apr 13, 1929	Mar 27, 1930	348 days	Centre Party	Müller II
	Theodor von Guérard (2) (1863 – 1943)	Mar 30, 1930	Oct 7, 1931	1 year, 191 days	Centre Party	Brüning I
	Gottfried Treviranus (1891–1971)	Oct 9, 1931	May 30, 1932	234 days	Conservative People's Party (KVP)	Brüning II
	Paul Freiherr von Eltz-Rübenach (1875–1943)	Jun 1, 1932	Feb 2, 1937	4 years, 246 days	Non-partisan	Papen; Schleicher; Hitler
	Julius Dorpmüller (1869–1945)	Feb 2, 1937	May 23, 1945	8 years, 110 days	Non-partisan until Jan 1941, then Nazi Party (NSDAP)	Hitler; Dönitz

^{1} The SPD withdrew from the Stresemann II Cabinet on 3 November 1923.
^{2} The DNVP withdrew from the Luther I Cabinet on 26 October 1925.

== List of state secretaries (Staatssekretäre) ==
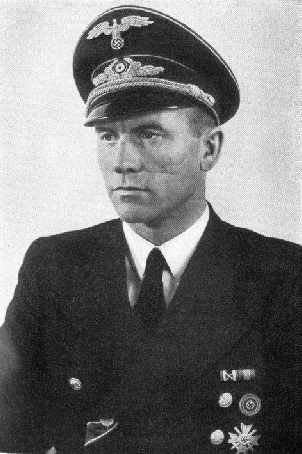
Albert Ganzenmüller, state secretary during World War II

- Max Peters (1919–1920), Leiter der Wasserstraßen-Abteilung
- Karl von Stieler (1919–1923)
- Paul Kirschstein (1920–1924), Leiter der Wasserstraßen-Abteilung
- Georg Bodenstein (1920–1924), Leiter der Zweigstelle Preußen-Hessen
- Max Kumbier (1921–1924), Leiter der eisenbahntechnischen Abteilung
- Johannes Vogt (1923–1924)
- Rudolf Krohne (1923–1924)
- Friedrich Wilhelm Gutbrod (1926–1932)
- Gustav Koenigs (1932–1940)
- Wilhelm Kleinmann (1937–1942)
- Albert Ganzenmüller (1942–1945)

== Buildings ==
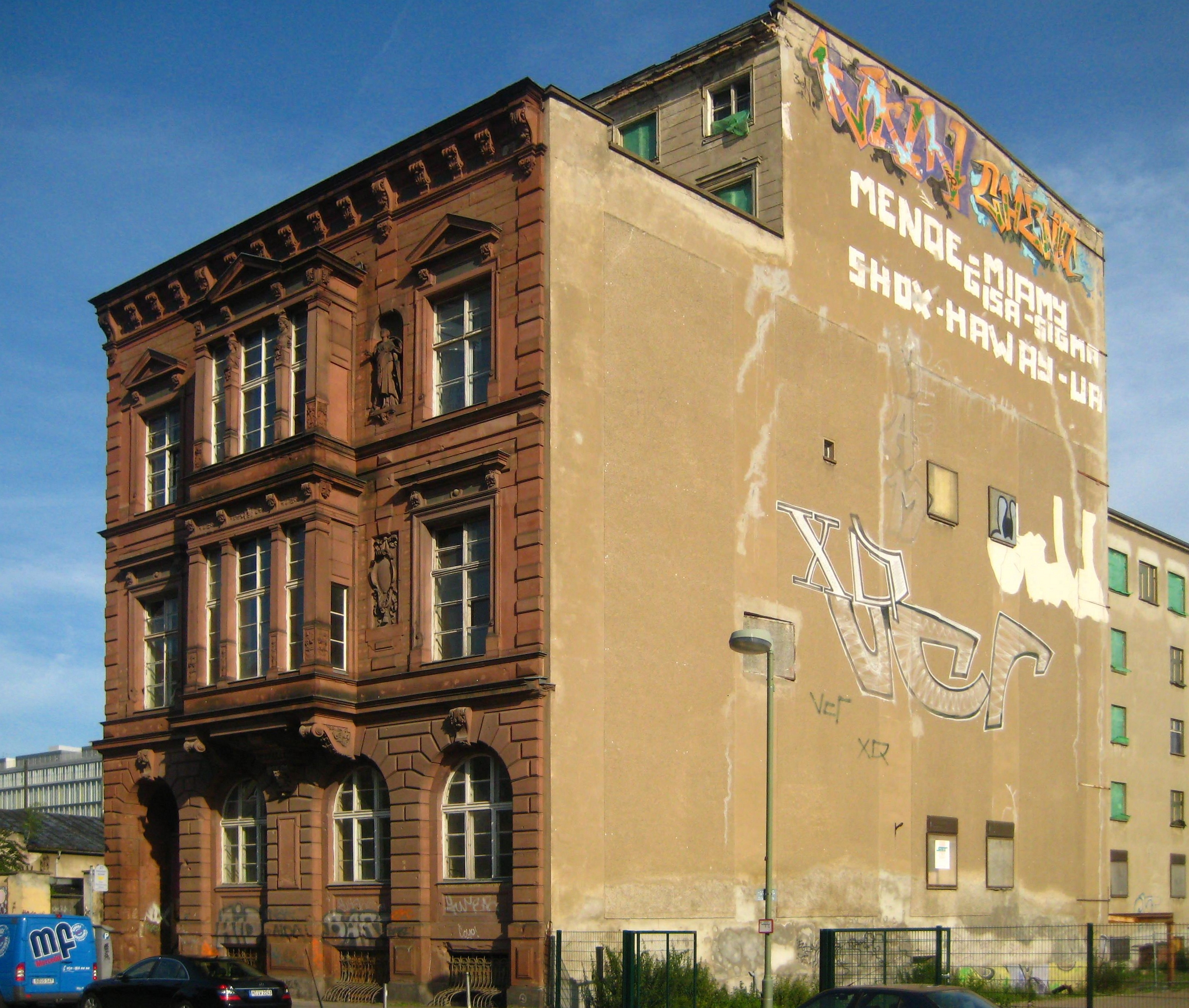
Reichsbahn building at Voßstraße 33, one of the two remaining parts of the Ministry, 2009

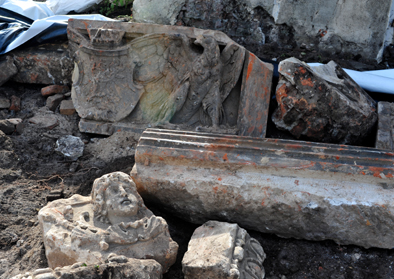
Fragments of the historic facade of the Ministry found during site demolition, 2012.

The headquarters of the Ministry were located in the Berlin-Mitte district at Voßstraße 34/35. The historicist central building initially housed the Prussian Ministry of Commerce, then the Prussian Ministry of Public Works, and was greatly enlarged by prominent German architect Richard Lucae between 1875 and 1878. As the RVM grew in the 1930s, it came to occupy an extensive range of buildings with façades on three streets: Voßstraße, Leipziger Straße and the Wilhelmstraße. It first expanded into the adjacent Imperial era mansion at Leipziger Straße 125 in 1937, then into the Deutsches Reichsbahn headquarters at Voßstraße 33 in 1939.

Just before the outbreak of World War II, construction of a large air-raid shelter with a 2.6-meter-thick concrete ceiling began under the Ministry courtyard and was completed in 1940. This was an extension of the Vorbunker under the New Reich Chancellery across the street. The RVM bunker included a passageway to the U2 subway tunnel south of the Kaiserhof station to provide a rail escape route for Nazi leadership. As the intensity of Allied bombing increased in 1944, essential RVM staff were moved southeast of Berlin to a secret area in Groß Köris on the western shore of the Güldensee, at a special rail siding code-named "Fishing Lodge". By the end of the war, the two ancillary wings of the Ministry were the only parts of the complex left standing - the rest was a ruin.

From 7 October 1949 the site was located in East Berlin. The GDR demolished the damaged buildings above ground and filled the basements with rubbish in the 1950s. The usable structure at Voßstraße 33 became the administration building for East German railways until after German reunification in 1990. By 1996 the address was empty, fell into disrepair, and became a site for illegal parties. In 2004 the association "Art and Culture House Voßstraße e.V." began using the building as a gallery and events venue. At Leipziger Straße 125, a library and medical facilities were located next to a travel agency. The West German construction company "Hermann Koehne", mainly active in railroad track construction, had its headquarters there from 1990 to 1996. The building stood empty after that.

After a long-running legal dispute between Deutsche Bahn and the Federal Government, the approximately 10,000 m^{2} site was sold in April 2012 to Berlin Investor Harald Huth. Demolition of the still existing parts of the Ministry, including cellars on the Wilhelmstraße and buried elements of the air-raid bunkers, began in September 2012. The historic Leipziger Straße 125 and Voßstraße 33 were preserved and are today under monument protection. By September 2014 the rest of the site was occupied by a new retail, hotel, office and apartment complex incorporated into the Mall of Berlin, one of the largest shopping centers in Germany.
