= Wilhelm Groener =

German general and politician (1867–1939)

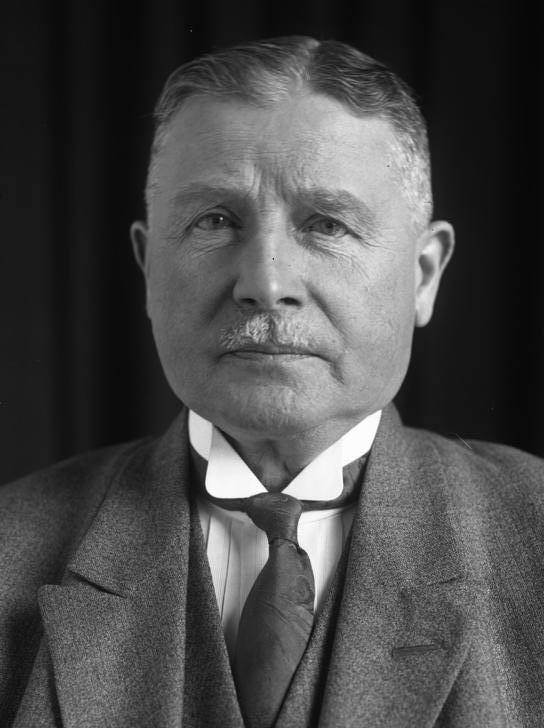
- Groener in 1928

Reich Minister of Defence Weimar Republic
- In office 20 January 1928 – 13 May 1932
- Chancellor: Wilhelm Marx; Hermann Müller; Heinrich Brüning
- Preceded by: Otto Gessler
- Succeeded by: Kurt von Schleicher

Reich Minister of the Interior Weimar Republic
- In office 9 October 1931 – 1 June 1932
- Chancellor: Heinrich Brüning
- Preceded by: Joseph Wirth
- Succeeded by: Wilhelm von Gayl

Reich Minister of Transport Weimar Republic
- In office 25 June 1920 – 12 August 1923
- Chancellor: Constantin Fehrenbach; Joseph Wirth; Wilhelm Cuno
- Preceded by: Gustav Bauer
- Succeeded by: Rudolf Oeser

Chief of the German General Staff German Empire
- In office 3 July 1919 – 7 July 1919
- Preceded by: Paul von Hindenburg
- Succeeded by: Hans von Seeckt

Personal details
- Born: Karl Eduard Wilhelm Groener; 22 November 1867 Ludwigsburg, Neckar District, Württemberg
- Died: 3 May 1939 (aged 71) Potsdam-Bornstedt, Brandenburg, Nazi Germany
- Party: Independent

Military service
- Allegiance: German Empire
- Branch/service: German Army: Württemberg Army
- Years of service: 1884–1919
- Rank: Generalleutnant
- Battles/wars: World War I

Karl Eduard Wilhelm Groener (German pronunciation: [ˈvɪlhɛlm ˈɡʁøːnɐ]; 22 November 1867 – 3 May 1939) was a Württemberg–German general and politician, who served as the final Chief of the Great General Staff and Reich Minister of Transport, Defence and the Interior.

After a confrontation with Erich Ludendorff, the Quartermaster general (Erster Generalquartiermeister) of the German Army, Groener was reassigned to a field command. When Ludendorff was dismissed in October 1918, Groener succeeded him. Groener worked with the new Social Democratic president Friedrich Ebert to foil a left-wing take-over during the German Revolution of 1918–1919. Under his command, the army bloodily suppressed popular uprisings throughout Germany.

Groener tried to integrate the military, which was dominated by an aristocratic and monarchistic officer corps, into the new republic. After resigning from the army in the summer of 1919, Groener served in several governments of the Weimar Republic. He was pushed out of the government in 1932 by Kurt von Schleicher, who was working on a pact with the Nazis.

== Early life ==
Wilhelm Groener was born in Ludwigsburg in the Kingdom of Württemberg as the son of Karl Eduard Groener (1837–1893), regimental paymaster, and his wife Auguste (née Boleg, 1825–1907) on 22 November 1867. After attending gymnasium at Ulm and Ludwigsburg, where his father had been stationed, Groener entered the 3. Württembergische Infanterie Regiment Nummer 121 of the Württemberg Army in 1884. In 1890, he was promoted to Bataillonsadjutant and from 1893 to 1896 attended the War Academy at Berlin, where he finished top of his class. In 1899, Groener married Helene Geyer (1864–1926) in Schwäbisch Gmünd. They had a daughter, Dorothea Groener-Geyer (b. 1900).

== Military career ==
=== Pre-war ===
As a captain, he won appointment to the General Staff in 1899 and was attached to the railway section, where he worked for the next 17 years. This was only interrupted for the usual assignments to other locations, from 1902 to 1904 he was Kompaniechef of Infantry Regiment 98 at Metz, from 1908 to 1910 he was with the XIII Army Corps and in 1910 he became a battalion commander in Infantry Regiment 125 at Stuttgart. In 1912, as a lieutenant-colonel, Groener became head of the railway section at the General Staff. His plans for the extension of the railway network and for deployment routes were based on the deployment plans of Alfred von Schlieffen, the Chief of the General Staff of the German Army from 1891 to 1906.

=== World War I ===
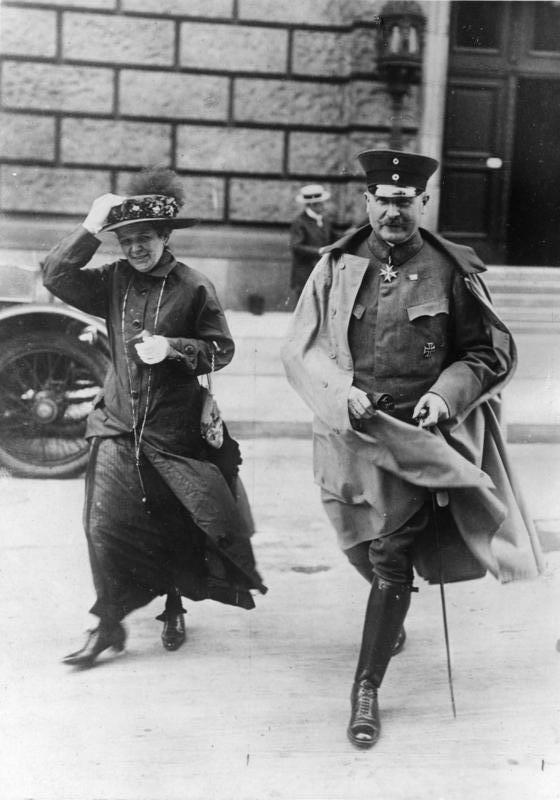
Groener as deputy war minister of Prussia in 1917 (with his first wife on the left)

The deployment of millions of troops to the frontier by rail boosted Groener's reputation and he received numerous decorations in 1914. In June 1915, he was promoted to Generalmajor. Due to his organisational ability, in December 1915, Groener was put in charge of food deliveries from Romania. In May 1916, he joined the leadership of the newly created Kriegsernährungsministerium (War Food Ministry). In November 1916, as a Generalleutnant, he became head of the Kriegsamt (War Office), the department that managed the war economy and deputy of the Prussian Minister of War.

With Erich Ludendorff, Groener worked on the draft for the Hilfsdienstgesetz (Auxiliary Services Act, 1916), which laid down the conscription of men (Arbeitszwang) for the war economy. Groener negotiated with the civilian bureaucracy, unions and representatives of the employers. Despite his efforts to appear neutral to maximise output, he became the target of criticism. Factory owners resented him for accepting the unions as partners. Revolutionary groups used his strict admonishments against those who went on strike while soldiers died at the front to undermine his standing with the workers. The negotiations made the limits of Germany's military power obvious to Groener and he began to doubt that Germany could win the war. This caused confrontations with the third Oberste Heeresleitung (OHL, the supreme command of the German army), led by Paul Hindenburg and Ludendorff. During the change at the Reichskanzlei in July 1917, when Georg Michaelis replaced Theobald von Bethmann Hollweg as Chancellor, Groener suggested that the state should intervene to limit corporate profits and the wage growth that resulted from booming war-related public demand. On 16 August 1917, he was recalled from his post and reassigned to an operational command. This was seen by the public as a response to his views on social policy.

Groener served for six months at the western front, first as the commander of the 33rd Division, and then of the XXV Reserve Corps, where he was able to observe trench warfare and the mood of the troops. In March 1918, he commanded the I Corps during the occupation of Ukraine. On 28 March, he was appointed chief of staff of the army group Heeresgruppe Eichhorn-Kiew. This task required him to deal with organisational and political challenges, in particular confrontations with the army high command of Austria-Hungary and supervising, then reshuffling, the Ukrainian government which needed help against Bolshevik revolutionaries.

=== End of the war and German revolution ===
After the dismissal of Erich Ludendorff on 26 October 1918, Groener was recalled and on 29 October appointed as Ludendorff's successor as First Quartermaster General (Deputy Chief of the General Staff) under Hindenburg. The military situation was becoming untenable and social unrest and rebellion in the German armed forces and the civilian population threatened to break out into revolution. Groener started to prepare the withdrawal and demobilisation of the army. As the revolution spread through Germany in early November, Groener began to see the Emperor, Wilhelm II, as an impediment to saving the monarchy and the integrity of the army. Privately, he felt the Kaiser should sacrifice himself in a hero's death at the front.

On 6 November, Groener reacted indignantly when the Social Democrat Friedrich Ebert suggested that the Kaiser should abdicate. On 9 November, when the Kaiser suggested using the army to crush the revolution at home, Groener advised him to abdicate, because he had lost the confidence of the armed forces. Groener's goal was to preserve the monarchy, but under a different ruler. He was also in favour of accepting the armistice conditions put to the German government, despite their severe nature.

On the evening of 10 November, Groener contacted the new chancellor, Friedrich Ebert, and concluded the Ebert-Groener pact, which was to remain secret for a number of years. Ebert agreed to suppress the Bolshevik revolutionaries and to maintain the traditional role of the armed forces as a pillar of the German state; Groener promised that the army would support the new government. For this act, Groener earned the enmity of many other military leaders, many of whom sought the retention of the monarchy.

Groener oversaw the retreat and demobilisation of the defeated German army after the signing of the armistice on 11 November 1918. Despite a very tight schedule, the withdrawal was effected without problems. Groener organised the defence of the eastern borders of the Reich until a peace treaty could be signed. The headquarters of OHL, at Schloss Wilhelmshöhe from 14 November 1918 to 13 February 1919, was moved to Kolberg. Groener also planned for and expected the German peacetime army to be built up to 300,000 in the coming years, a plan that would be ruined by the Treaty of Versailles.

On 23 June 1919, Ebert asked OHL for an opinion on whether the Reich should sign the Treaty of Versailles. Groener supported signing as he was worried that the unity of the Reich would be in danger if fighting was resumed, contradicting the officer corps and the views of Walther Reinhardt, the Prussian Minister of War. Hindenburg followed Groener on this issue and when Hindenburg resigned, Groener succeeded him. Groener, who expected to be made a scapegoat, began cooperating in this process to save Hindenburg's reputation, something Ebert immediately noticed. OHL was dissolved as a condition of the treaty, and Groener temporarily took over command at Kolberg. He started to organise the establishment of the new peacetime (Reichswehr), arguing in favour of a high share of former general staff officers among the new leadership, including in the Reichswehrministerium. He also supported a senior position for Hans von Seeckt. On 30 September, Groener resigned from the army, against the wishes of Ebert; Groener felt that his pact with the Social Democrats had cost him the trust of many of his fellow officers.

== Political career ==
After his resignation from the army, Groener moved in and out of retirement during the 1920s. Not a member of any party, at Ebert's request, he served as Minister of Transport between 1920 and 1923. His main achievement was the rebuilding of the Reichsbahn. In 1923, when the Cuno government resigned, Groener left politics and wrote military and political treatises, such as Das Testament des Grafen Schlieffen (1927).

Hindenburg, Ebert's successor as Reichspräsident, appointed Groener as the successor of Otto Geßler as Minister of Defence on 20 January 1928, a post he held until 1932. Besides expanding the Reichswehr, Groener made an effort to integrate it into the society of the Weimar Republic. In 1930, Groener married Ruth Naeher-Glück (born 1894) in Berlin and had a son. This second marriage and the early birth date of his son undermined Groener's relationship with the conservative Hindenburg.

On 8 October 1931, Groener became acting Interior Minister in the government of Heinrich Brüning and favoured the banning of the Nazi Sturmabteilung (SA storm troops). As Interior Minister, he was asked to outlaw the SA, whilst his goal as Defence Minister was to integrate it into a national, non-partisan paramilitary force. In April 1932, under pressure from several German states, Groener outlawed the SA and Schutzstaffel (SS). Kurt von Schleicher, his subordinate at the Reichswehrministerium, wanted to cooperate with the two groups and worked on Hindenburg to have Groener dismissed. Von Schleicher also allied himself with the Nazi Party. After a rhetorical defeat in the Reichstag, Groener resigned on 13 May as Defence Minister, urged by Schleicher, who told Groener that he had lost the trust of the Reichswehr. When the Brüning government fell on 30 May, Groener also lost his position as Innenminister and left politics for good.

Historian Felix Gilbert expressed to historian Peter Gay his opinion that Groener was "the most overrated man in the Weimar Republic," a view about which Gay wrote in 1968, "It is time that such an opinion is publicly recorded."

Groener moved to Potsdam-Bornstedt in 1934, where he wrote his memoirs, Lebenserinnerungen. Groener died of natural causes in Bornstedt on 3 May 1939. He is buried in the Stahnsdorf South-Western Cemetery, between Potsdam and Berlin.

== Decorations and awards ==
- Pour le Mérite (11 September 1915)
- Commander of the Military Order of Max Joseph Bavaria
- Officer of the Military Merit Order with Swords (Bavaria)
- Knight of the Military Merit Order (Württemberg)
- Order of the Red Eagle, 2nd class with Crown and Swords (1917)
- Honorary citizen of Ludwigsburg

== Bibliography ==
- Eschenburg, Theodor, "The Role of the Personality in the Crisis of the Weimar Republic: Hindenburg, Brüning, Groener, Schleicher", pages 3–50 from Republic to Reich The Making Of The Nazi Revolution, edited by Hajo Holborn, New York: Pantheon Books, 1972, ISBN 978-0-394-47122-8.
- Groener, Wilhelm, Lebenserinnerungen: Jugend – Generalstab – Weltkrieg. Edited by Friedrich Frhr. Hiller von Gaertringen. Göttingen: Vandenhoeck und Ruprecht, 1957. OCLC 942998885.
- Groener-Geyer, Dorothea. General Groener: Soldat und Staatsmann. Frankfurt a. M.: Societäts-Verlag, 1955. OCLC 299954115.
- Haeussler, Helmut H. General William Groener and the Imperial German Army. Madison: State Historical Society of Wisconsin for Dept. of History, University of Wisconsin–Madison, 1962. Available online: OCLC 610198939.
- Hürter, Johannes. Wilhelm Groener: Reichswehrminister am Ende der Weimarer Republik (1928–1932). Munich: Oldenbourg, 1993. ISBN 978-3-486-55978-1.
- Rakenius, Gerhard W. Wilhelm Groener als Erster Generalquartiermeister: Die Politik der Obersten Heeresleitung 1918/1919. Boppard a.R.: Boldt, 1977. ISBN 978-3-486-81738-6.
- Stoneman, Mark R. Wilhelm Groener, Officering, and the Schlieffen Plan, (PhD) Georgetown University, 2006. OCLC 173237457.
- Wheeler-Bennett, Sir John. The Nemesis of Power: German Army in Politics, 1918–1945. New York: Palgrave Macmillan, 2005. ISBN 978-1-4039-1812-3.
- Chisholm, Hugh, ed. (1922). "Groener, Wilhelm" . Encyclopædia Britannica (12th ed.). London & New York: The Encyclopædia Britannica Company.

Military offices
Preceded by Paul von Hindenburg	Chief of the General Staff; 1919	Succeeded by Hans von Seeckt
Political offices
Preceded by Gustav Bauer	Transportation Minister of Germany; 1920 – 1923	Succeeded by Rudolf Oeser
Preceded by Otto Geßler	Defence Minister of Germany; 1928 – 1932	Succeeded by Kurt von Schleicher
Preceded by Joseph Wirth	Interior Minister of Germany; 1931 – 1932	Succeeded by Wilhelm Freiherr von Gayl
