= Julius Dorpmüller =

German politician and railway manager

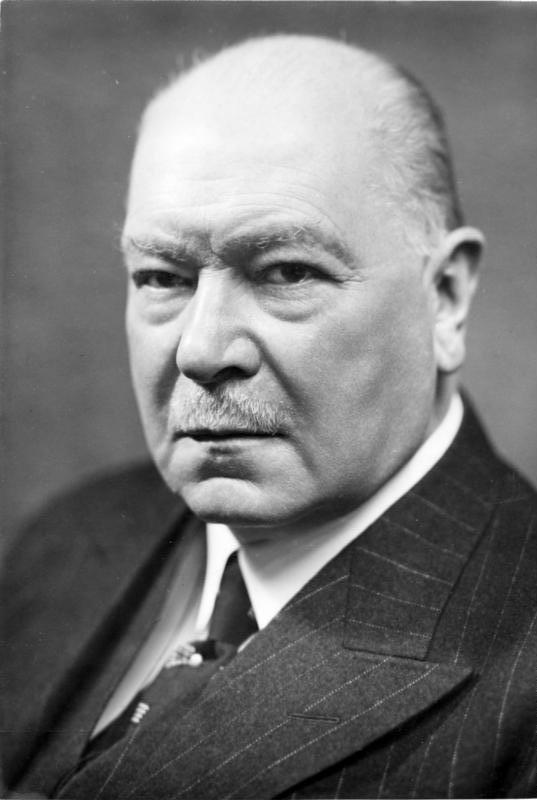
- Dorpmüller in 1939

Reich Minister for Transport
- In office 2 February 1937 – 30 April 1945
- President: Adolf Hitler (as Führer)
- Chancellor: Adolf Hitler
- Preceded by: Paul Freiherr von Eltz-Rübenach
- Succeeded by: Himself

Reich Minister for Transport, Communications and Posts
- In office 5 May 1945 – 23 May 1945
- President: Karl Dönitz
- Chancellor: Lutz Graf Schwerin von Krosigk
- Preceded by: Himself (as Minister for Transport); Wilhelm Ohnesorge (as Postal Minister)
- Succeeded by: Position abolished

Personal details
- Born: 24 July 1869 Elberfeld, Rhine Province, North German Confederation
- Died: 5 July 1945 (aged 75) Malente, Schleswig-Holstein, Allied-occupied Germany
- Party: Nazi Party (from 1 February 1941)
- Known for: Leading the Deutsche Reichsbahn during World War II

Julius Heinrich Dorpmueller (24 July 1869 – 5 July 1945) was general manager of Deutsche Reichsbahn-Gesellschaft from 1926 to 1945, a Nazi politician and the Reich Minister for Transport from 1937 to 1945.

== Life ==
Dorpmueller was the son of a railway engineer, and studied railway and road construction from 1889 to 1893. After graduating in 1898, Dorpmueller was active in the Prussian state railway administration. In 1907, he stepped down as an executive of the technical office and went into the service of the Schantung railway in Qingdao. In 1908, he was appointed chief engineer for the German section of the new Chinese Imperial state Tianjin-Pukou railway. Due to the declaration of war by China against the German Reich, he returned as a refugee in 1918, passing through Manchuria, Siberia and Russia to Germany. In the light railway service, he was active in the management of the Transcaucasian SFSR railways. In 1919, he became departmental head with German Reich Railways (Deutsche Reichseisenbahnen) in the Stettin district. From 1922 to 30 September 1924, he was a president in the Deutsche Reichseisenbahnen in the Oppeln district, and from 1 October 1924 to 1925, he was president in the Ruhr district; due to his comprehensive experience in light railways, Dorpmueller was consulted as part of the Dawes Plan.

After 1925 the board of directors of the German Reich Railway (Deutsche Reichsbahn Gesellschaft) created a position entitled Permanent Representative of the general manager (Head of the Railway), as general manager Rudolf Oeser was seriously ill; Dorpmueller was appointed to this post on 3 July 1925. In December 1925 RWTH Aachen, in acknowledgment of his services to railways awarded him a doctorate in engineering. On 3 June 1926, the day of Rudolf Oeser's death he was selected by the board of directors to become the German railway's general manager. Due to political considerations it was only confirmed on 18 October 1926 by the President of Germany.

== Nazi career ==
After the Nazi seizure of power Dorpmüller replaced nearly all "non-Aryan" workers with Nazis. Dorpmüller became Reich Transport Minister on 2 February 1937 after the resignation of his predecessor Paul Freiherr von Eltz-Rübenach. In April 1938, when a Berlin train stopped in Passau, Dorpmüller was ceremonially welcomed and escorted to the Danube, where he continued his trip to Linz and Vienna on board the Austrian Wotan. On 11 July 1939 the "law concerning the Deutsche Reichsbahn" (German Reich Railway) was issued and Dorpmüller was confirmed as transport minister and also General Manager of the Deutsche Reichsbahn.

According to Albert Speer, Dorpmüller confessed that "The Reichsbahn has so few cars and locomotives available for the German area that it can no longer assume responsibility for meeting the most urgent transportation needs." Speer then convinced Hitler to name Albert Ganzenmüller as State Secretary in place of Dorpmüller's long-time deputy, Wilhelm Kleinmann. Though he had entered the cabinet with no party affiliation, Dorpmüller was awarded the Golden Party Badge on 7 December 1940 and joined the Nazi Party on 1 February 1941 (membership number 7,883,826). Dorpmüller was not mentioned in Hitler's will and was therefore not in the Goebbels cabinet. But was in the Flensburg Government as he was named Minister for Transport, Communications and Posts.

== Post war career ==
After the end of the war, the British then asked Dorpmueller to take over reconstruction of the German railways: Dorpmueller and his representative Albert Ganzenmüller were brought by air, by the United States, to Chesnay in Paris, in order to meet for negotiations over the reorganization of German transport. American general Carl R. Gray Jr. had expressly recommended Dorpmueller to General Dwight D Eisenhower for "re-instatement to his old office", because he—as also "our secret service confirms"—had been neither a "Nazi sympathizer nor activist". With difficulty, as he was suffering from cancer, Dorpmueller returned on 13 June 1945 to Malente and from there, gave advice on reconstruction. On 23 June 1945 he was operated on—again—but his digestive system no longer functioned, so his health deteriorated rapidly. Despite this, he led official discussions, in full coherence, until two days before his death.

Dorpmueller died on 5 July 1945 and was buried in Malente.

== After his death ==
In accordance with an October 1949 letter from Lübeck's denazification main committee to Maria Dorpmueller, Julius's sister, he was said to have obtained "relief" under category V classification. In the honours lists of the Aachen university 1995 anniversary publication, he was listed as an honorary doctor (1925) and an honorary senator (1939), with no further details. In the Nuremberg transport museum and in the "Dorpmueller Hall" of the main station of Hanover there were busts of Dorpmueller, until 1985, when they were removed during preparations for celebration of the sesquicentenary of the introduction of railways to Germany. In the Essen railway's head office there was once a "Dorpmueller room", which was renamed in 1985 to "Small meeting room"; the bust there also disappeared. Roads in the cities Wuppertal, Minden and Hameln, were originally named after Dorpmuller and have also been renamed.

In September 1994, someone from Ratingen complained to German railways about Dorpmüller's "badly maintained" grave. In a letter from them in response in January 1995, they said that the former BD Hamburg had maintained the grave until the end of 1991, a decision by the former executive committee of the German Federal Railroads meant there was no more provision for maintenance thereafter. In the middle of 1995, someone from Hamburg tidied up the grave and took over care at their own expense.

== Honors and medals ==
- 1913 Order of the Red Eagle, 4th class
- 1925 Honorary Doctorate of Engineering, University of Aachen
- 1934 Gold Medal of the Prussian Academy for Construction
- 1936 Grashof Commemorative Medal of the Association of German Engineers
- 1936 Member of the Reich Chamber of Labour
- 1936 Member of the Academy for German Law
- 1936 Grand Cross Royal Swedish Order of the Pole Star
- 1937 Member of the Prussian State Council
- 12 November 1938 Karmarsch Medal (community of the Leibniz University Hannover)
- 24 July 1939 Eagle Shield of the German Reich
- 1939 Honorary Senator of the Technical University of Aachen
- 7 December 1940 Golden Party Badge of the NSDAP
- Knights Cross of the War Merit Cross (twice: one with Swords – 24 July 1944; and one without Swords – 18 September 1943)
