= Wilhelm von Gayl =

German politician (1879–1945)

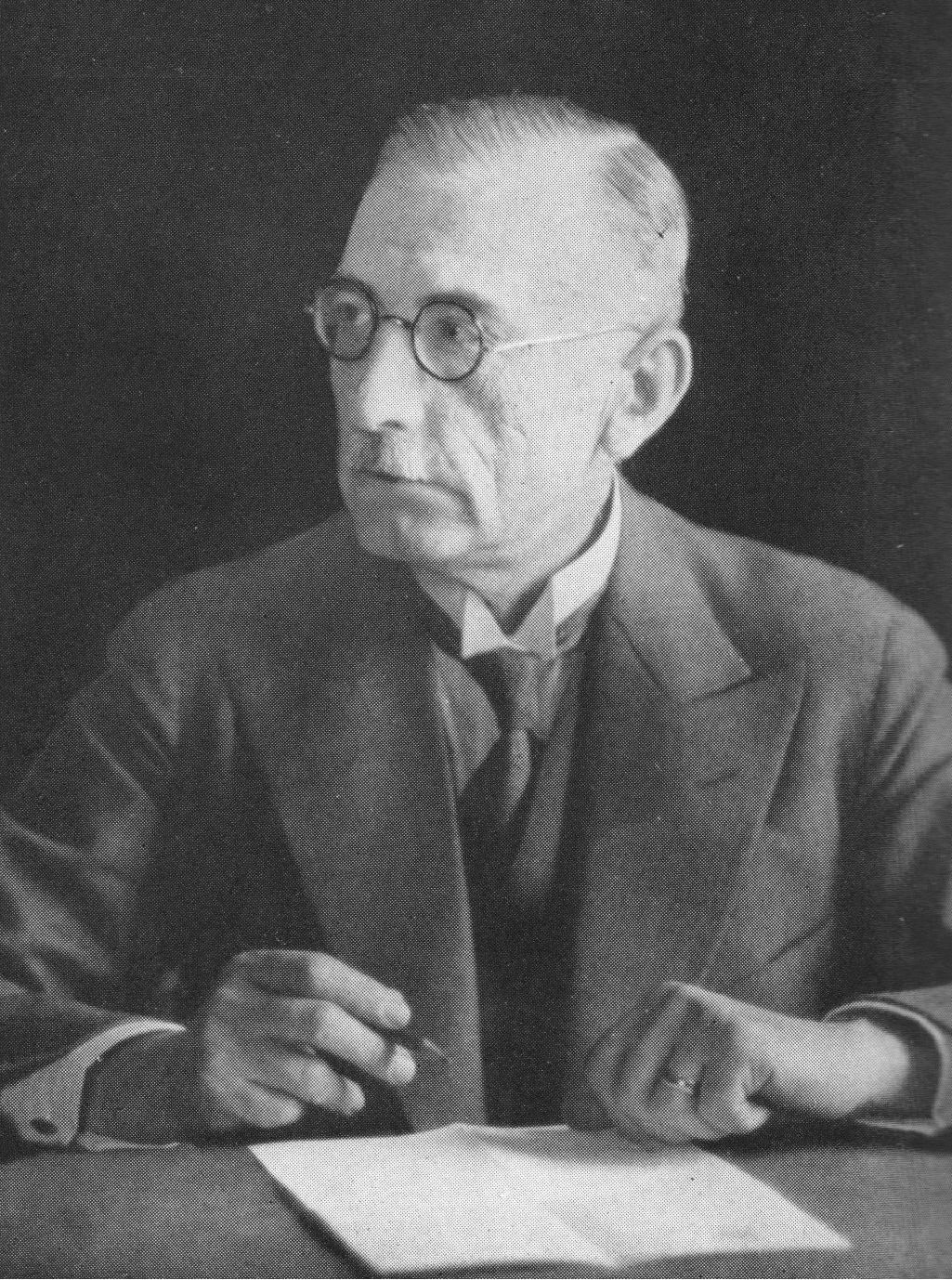

Reich Minister of the Interior
- In office 1 June 1932 – 3 December 1932
- President: Paul von Hindenburg
- Chancellor: Franz von Papen
- Preceded by: Wilhelm Groener
- Succeeded by: Franz Bracht

Personal details
- Born: Wilhelm Moritz Egon, Freiherr von Gayl; 4 February 1879 Königsberg, East Prussia, German Empire
- Died: 7 November 1945 (aged 66) Potsdam, Allied-occupied Germany
- Party: German National People's Party (DNVP)
- Education: University of Bonn

Wilhelm Moritz Egon Freiherr von Gayl (4 February 1879 – 7 November 1945) was a German jurist and politician of the German National People's Party (DNVP).

== Biography ==
Gayl was born in Königsberg, capital of the Prussian province of East Prussia (today Kaliningrad, Russia) and studied law at the universities of Berlin, Göttingen and Bonn. In 1909 he became the director of the Ostpreussische Landgesellschaft, a settlement society for East Prussia .

He served throughout the First World War, initially as an officer on active service, and was decorated with the Iron Cross first class, but soon joined the administration of Ober Ost, the supreme command of all German forces in the east. In 1916, he became chief of the department of interior politics and administration of Ober Ost and, on 1 September 1918, Landeshauptmann ("state captain") of northern Lithuania at Kaunas.

In 1919, Gayl was a member of the German delegation at the Versailles conference and became the German Commissioner for the Allenstein Plebiscite precinct throughout the East Prussian plebiscite in 1920.

Gayl was a member of the Prussian State Council in 1921–33 and was the East Prussian deputy at the Reichsrat from 1921 to 1932. He sat as a deputy in the provincial parliament of the Province of East Prussia from 1929 to its dissolution in 1933. He was the head of the Society for the Encouragement of Inner Colonization in 1925–32 and became the chairman of the Reichsboard of Youth fitness (Reichskuratorium für Jugendertüchtigung) in 1932.

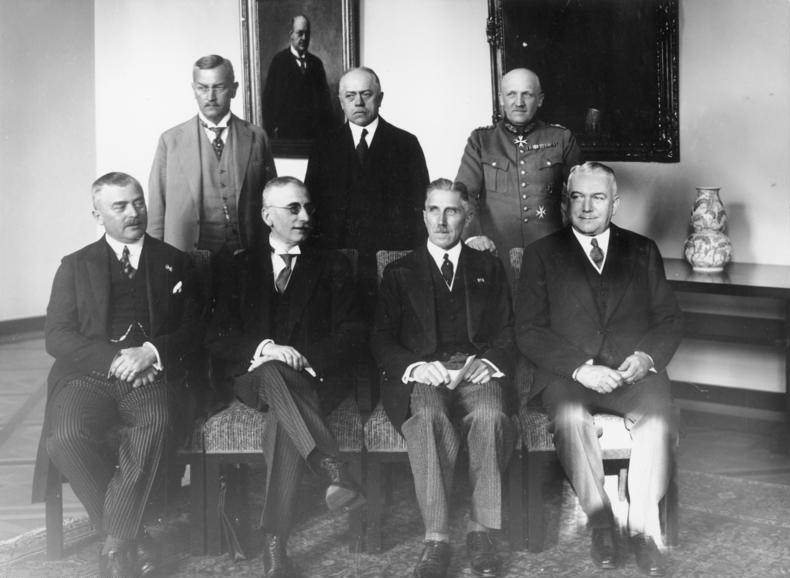
Papen's "Cabinet of Barons", with Gayl sitting second from the left

On 1 June 1932, Gayl became the Secretary of Interior of Franz von Papen's "Cabinet of Barons" implemented by President Paul von Hindenburg according to Article 48. One of his first actions as a minister was to establish an obligatory program at every Reichs-Rundfunk-Gesellschaft broadcasting company called the "hour of the government". Every day between 6:30 and 7:30 p.m. the companies had to provide 30 minutes of transmission time for representatives of the government. Papen used this opportunity eighteen times in the six months of his term in office while he never spoke at the Weimar German Parliament.

Gayl was one of the initiators of the Preußenschlag against the Social Democratic government in Prussia in July 1932 but strongly opposed any cooperation with Hitler's Nazi Party. Instead Gayl supported Carl Schmitt's concept of a constitutional state of emergency (Staatsnotstand) and supposed to implement a pure presidential government by a dissolution of the Reichstag without the appointment of elections within 60 days, as provided by the Weimar Constitution.

After Chancellor Papen had resigned on 17 November, Gayl lost his position with the appointment of Kurt von Schleicher's cabinet on 3 December 1932. He died in Potsdam shortly after the end of World War II.

== Publications ==
- Ostpreußen unter fremden Flaggen - Ein Erinnerungsbuch an die ostpreußische Volksabstimmung vom 11. Juli 1920, Königsberg 1940.

== Literature ==
- Wolfgang von der Groeben: Verzeichnis der Mitglieder des Corps Saxonia zu Göttingen 1844 bis 2006, Düsseldorf 2006
