= Wilhelm Sollmann =

German journalist and politician (1881–1951)

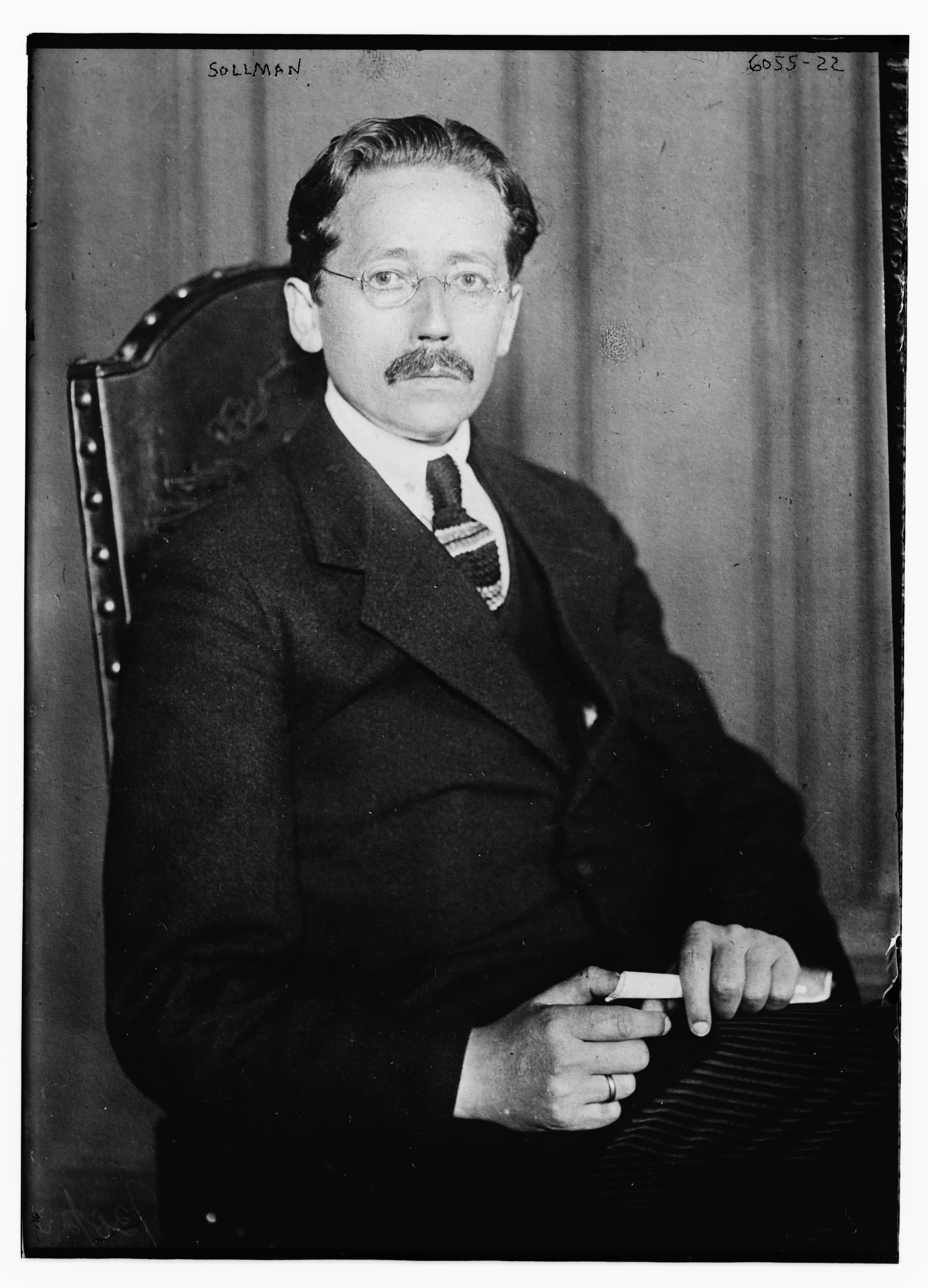
- Wilhelm Sollmann in 1923

Reich Minister of the Interior
- In office 13 August 1923 – 3 November 1923
- Chancellor: Gustav Stresemann
- Preceded by: Rudolf Oeser
- Succeeded by: Karl Jarres

Member of the Reichstag
- In office 1920–1933
- Constituency: Köln-Aachen

Member of the Weimar National Assembly
- In office 6 February 1919 – 21 May 1920
- Constituency: Köln-Aachen

Personal details
- Born: 1 April 1881 Oberlind, Saxe-Meiningen, German Empire
- Died: 6 January 1951 (aged 69) Hamden, Connecticut, U.S.
- Party: Social Democratic Party
- Profession: Journalist and politician

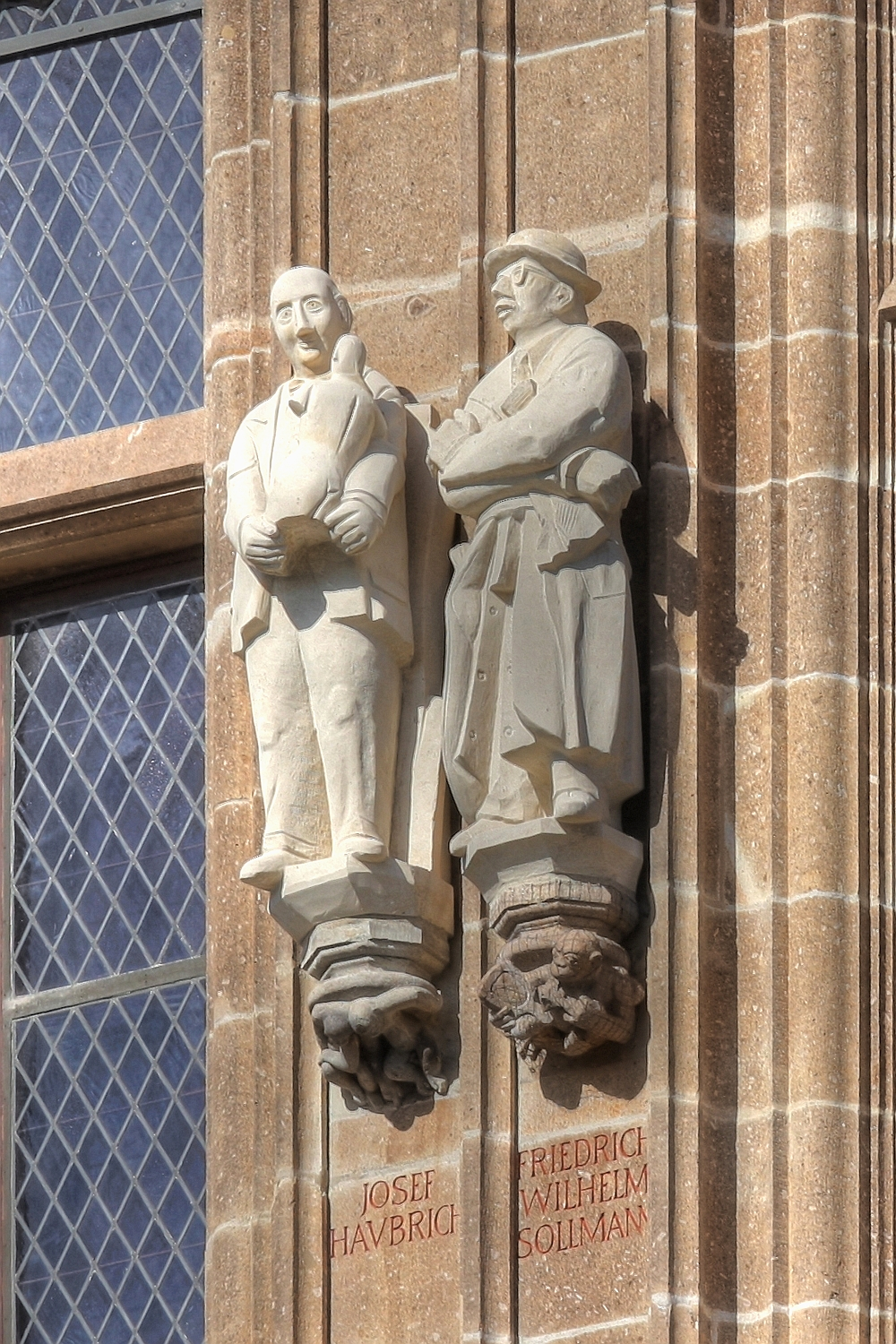
Right: Statue of Wilhelm Sollmann at the city hall tower of Cologne, Germany

Friedrich Wilhelm Sollmann (1 April 1881 – 6 January 1951), later William Frederick Sollmann, was a German journalist, politician, and interior minister of the Weimar Republic. In 1919, he was on the staff of the German delegation that was to receive the Treaty of Versailles. In 1933, he emigrated and eventually moved to the United States where he became an advocate for the peaceful resolution of conflicts.

== Life ==
=== Early life in the German Empire ===
Wilhelm Sollmann was born on 2 April 1881 in Oberlind, Saxe-Meiningen (today a part of Sonneberg, Thuringia). His father was Johan Jakob Sollmann, a brewer and farmer in Oberlind and after 1889 tenant of the Ratskeller at Coburg. His mother was Christiane Sollmann, inn keeper. After the move to Coburg, Wilhelm attended the Casimirianum gymnasium from 1891 to 1897, when he had to leave due to the family's financial difficulties. That year, his family moved to Cologne. There, he began work as an apprentice (kaufmännische Lehre). From 1901-11 he worked as a Handlungsgehilfe whilst attending night school at the Handelshochschule Köln. Originally rooted in Lutheran Christianity, he was a member of the Internationaler Guttempler-Orden and the CVJM. However, in 1902 he joined the Social Democratic Party of Germany (SPD) and in 1907 co-founded the Workers' Youth at Cologne. He was also active in the temperance movement and was chairman of the Arbeiter-Abstinenzbewegung (workers' temperance movement, 1906–10). He was also a member of the Angestelltengwerkschaft (white-collar workers' union). In 1906, Sollmann married Anna Katharina (Käthe, Kate) née Grümmer (born 1883, died before 1975). They had one daughter, Elfriede (1912–97). In 1908, Sollmann became a Freidenker.

In 1911, Sollmann became editor of the socialdemocratic newspaper Fränkischer Volksfreund at Würzburg, but soon returned to Cologne where he became editor (1912) and later editor-in-chief (1920–33) of the Rheinische Zeitung. During World War I, Sollmann was the chairman of the social democratic union (Verein) of Cologne.

=== German Revolution and Weimar Republic ===
During the German Revolution of 1918 he played a key role in the workers' and soldiers' council of Cologne. From 1918-24, Sollmann was a member of the Cologne municipal parliament (Stadtverordneter). In 1919, he was elected to the Weimar National Assembly and held his seat until the new elections to the Reichstag in 1920. Working closely with Konrad Adenauer, whom he later described as "a personal friend and political enemy", Sollmann helped turn the Handelshochschule into the University of Cologne in 1919. He rejected an honorific doctorate in 1919 (and again in 1928) for personal reasons.

In 1919, Sollmann also was a staff member of the German delegation to the Paris Peace Conference in Versailles, where he served as an expert on problems of the Rheinland occupation. He was a member of the Reichstag from 1920 until 1933. In 1921, he initiated the establishment of the Sozialdemokratischer Parlamentsdienst (after 1924: Sozialdemokratischer Pressedienst), a political news service. From 13 August 1923 until his resignation on 3 November, he served as Reichsminister des Innern (Reich Minister of the Interior) in the cabinets of Gustav Stresemann.

In parliament, he served as a member of the Committee for Foreign Affairs, and as an expert on disarmament and adult education.

=== Germany 1933 and emigration ===
In 1933, he was elected to the executive board of the SPD and as such persecuted by the Nazis after the Machtergreifung. On 9 March, he was taken into Schutzhaft ("protective custody") and tortured. After being released, he fled in May via Luxembourg to the occupied Saar. There he briefly worked as the editor-in-chief of the socialdemocratic Volskstimme. After the referendum he returned to Luxembourg, in 1936 went on to the United Kingdom and in 1937 emigrated to the United States.

=== In America ===
In the U.S., Sollmann worked as a writer, speaker, radio announcer and faculty member (1937–1950) of the Pendle Hill Quaker Center for Study and Contemplation, a Quaker study center located in Wallingford, Pennsylvania.

In the next years, Sollmann travelled through most of the United States, giving lectures on world affairs. He became a visiting professor of international affairs at Haverford, Bard, and Reed Colleges.

Having lost his German citizenship in 1936, in 1943 he was naturalized and changed his name to William Frederick Sollmann. That year, he also became a Quaker.

A member of the SPD's right wing, in exile he was one of the leading proponents of the volkssozialistische Richtung within the party. At the request of the American Friends Service Committee, a Quaker organization, Sollmann briefly visited occupied Germany in 1948, where he held speeches and radio addresses. On another visit the following year he served as visiting professor at the University of Cologne. In 1949/50, the U.S. government consulted him on setting up a new German Civil Liberties Union (Bund für Bürgerrechte) and he worked for the Allied High Commission, but he had to return to the United States due to the onset of illness. During his visits, he met with politicians like Adenauer and Kurt Schumacher and also was Adenauer's guest of honour at the inaugural meeting of the Deutscher Bundestag. Sollmann was co-founder of the Carl Schurz-Gesellschaft, member of the Verbands deutscher Journalisten im Ausland and of the Legion for American Unity.

On 6 January 1951, Sollmann died in Mount Carmel, Connecticut.

A street in Cologne is named after him.

== Works ==
- "Zum Ausbau unserer sozialistischen Jugendbewegung", in: Die Neue Zeit, Wochenschrift der deutschen Sozialdemokratie, 1911
- Der Kölner Polizeiprozeß vom 7. – 17. 1. 1914, 1914
- "Ernährungsbeirat von Frauen", in: Die Gleichheit 26, 1916
- Die Revolution in Köln, 1918
- Sozialismus der Tat, 1925
- "Untergang Amerikas", in: Studierstube 23, 1927
- "Antwort an Josef Wirth, Wahlrecht und Parteien", in: Deutsche Republik 3, 1929
- Presse und Kommunalverwaltung, in: Vorträge und Abhandlungen internationaler Institute (Köln), R. 11, 1930
- "Jugend und Partei", in: Neue Blätter für den Sozialismus 2, 1931
- Alkohol und öffentliche Meinung, in: Alkoholismus, Gesundheitspolitik, Gesundheitswirtschaft, 1931
- "Schankstätten und Sozialhygiene", in: Zeitschrift für Gesundheitsverwaltung und Gesundheitsfürsorge 1, 1932
- Der politische Antisemitismus, in: Gegen die Phrase vom jüdischen Schädling, 1933
- "Sozialistische Machtpolitik", in: Zeitschrift für Sozialismus 2, 1935, pp. 758–65
- Religion and Politics, 1941
- German Labour, Hitler's Nemesis, in: Peace Aim Leaflets 1, 1943
- Educational Reconstruction in Germany, in: Schoolmen's Week Proceedings, 1944
- Zwischen Krieg und Frieden, 1948
