= Oststaat-Plan =

German plan for control of east Prussia

- Eastern State Plan
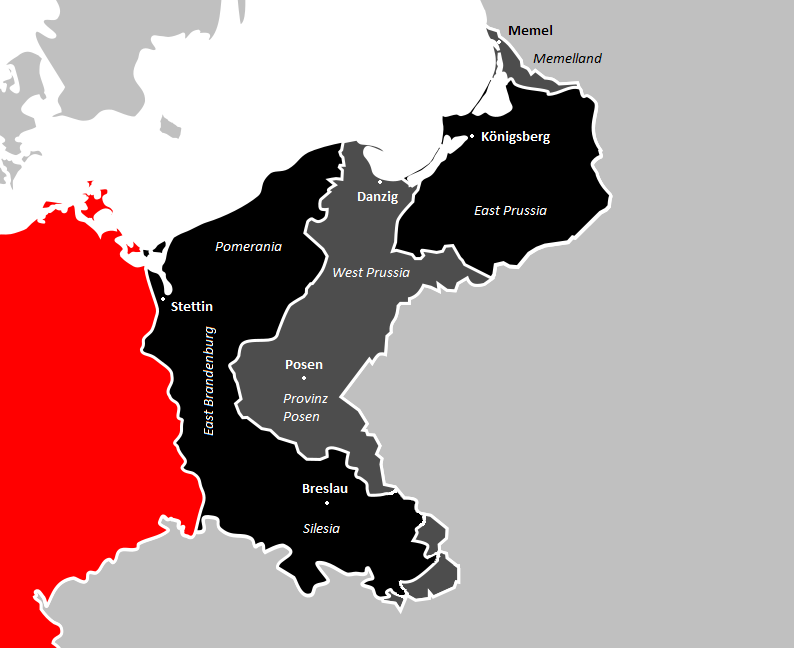
- Lands to be ceded to Poland according to the Treaty of Versailles in 1919
- Duration: 1918–1919
- Location: Eastern territories of the German Empire
- Goal(s): Secession of the Eastern provinces from Germany; Suppression of the Greater Poland uprising; Reassertion of German authority over the region
- Cause: Polish independence, Greater Poland Uprising, German eastern concessions following the Treaty of Versailles
- Patron(s): Adolf Von Batocki
- Outcome: Never realized

The Oststaat-Plan (German pronunciation: [ˈɔststɑːt plˈɑːn] lit. 'Eastern State Plan'), was a plan developed after World War I by Adolf von Batocki to secure German sovereignty over the eastern provinces of Prussia despite Polish territorial demands after Poland's independence and the Greater Poland Uprising in 1918. The plan failed due to lack of support from the German government.

== Background ==
At the end of World War I, US President Woodrow Wilson's Fourteen Points and the idea of national self-determination were met with opposition from European powers standing to lose influence or territory, such as Germany, which dominated Greater Poland. German politicians had signed an armistice leading to a ceasefire on 11 November 1918. Also, Germany had signed the Treaty of Brest-Litovsk with Bolshevik Russia to settle the territorial boundaries of the eastern frontiers. That treaty took into consideration of a future Polish state and so from then until the Treaty of Versailles was fully ratified in January 1920 many territorial and sovereignty issues remained unresolved.

Wilson's proposal for an independent Poland initially did not set borders that could be universally accepted. Most of Poland that was partitioned and annexed to Prussia in the late 18th century was still part of Greater Germany at the close of World War I, the rest of the Kingdom of Poland being in Austria-Hungary. The portion in Germany included the region of Greater Poland, of which Poznań (Posen) was a major industrial city and its capital. The majority of the population was Polish (more than 60%) and hoped to be within the borders of the new Polish state.

According to the Treaty of Versailles, Germany was to recognize the independence of Poland, which had been regained following a national revolution against the occupying Central Powers, and renounce "all rights and title" over Polish territory. Parts of Upper Silesia, the Province of Posen (which had come under Polish control during the Greater Poland Uprising), and Pomerelia were to be ceded to Poland. The sovereignty of part of southern East Prussia was to be decided via plebiscite while the East Prussian Soldau area, which was astride the rail line between Warsaw and Danzig, was transferred to Poland outright without plebiscite.

Three days before the signing of the peace treaty in Versailles, on June 25, 1919, a memorandum from the Prussian Interior Minister Wolfgang Heine arrived at the Reich Chancellery, stating that "The idea of an independent East German republic [was] often discussed in political circles in the East." suggesting that it could include "East and West Prussia, the Netze District, and possibly also the provinces of Köslin, Posen and Silesia", calling it "an extreme emergency measure." In the event of the German government signing the peace treaty, the provinces would fight for their allegiance to Germany, hoping that the regions would be able to returned after the collapse of Poland.

== The Plan ==
=== Support ===
On December 26, 1918, the Secret Government Councilor Georg Cleinow noted in a letter:

"...Mr. von Batocki apparently wants to create one German federal state from East Prussia, West Prussia, and the Netze District, and a second one from Silesia and the Posen administrative districts. The State Secretary of the Interior, Professor Dr. Preuß, is sympathetic to these ideas, while at the Foreign Office, Privy Legation Counselor Nadolny, an East Prussian, is supposed to work for them in agreement with Haase and Scheidemann..."

Batocki's free state, which would be integrated into the framework of the German Reich with extensive autonomy, was mainly supported by Rudolf Nadolny, the office manager of the Reich President Friedrich Ebert, and by August Winnig, but also saw support from the Chief President of West Prussia, von Schnackenburg, the Presidents of the Government Matthias von Oppen in Allenstein, Friedrich von Bülow in Bromberg, Oberbürgermeister Lord Mayor of Danzig Heinrich Sahm, Königsberg Mayor Bürgermeister Carl Friedrich Goerdeler and Georg Cleinow. Numerous telegrams had also arrived at the Reich Chancellery, in which people's councils, refugees, and military command posts repeatedly emphasized the unanimous will of the population in the Eastern provinces to resume the fight, with or without the support of the Reich leadership.

Hans von Seeckt, in his initial situation assessment of January 19, 1919, mentioned the intentions of the High President, which the latter had expressed to him at their very first meeting. Batocki, Seeckt reports, "was certain of the cession of the territory around Thorn and Danzig to Poland, since this had been granted by the Reich government's recognition of Wilson's Fourteen Points. East Prussia, after this separation, would no longer be viable and might have to seek annexation by its Polish neighbor." Seeckt sharply rejected any cooperation with Batocki, urging him to negotiate with him together with Polish government representatives.

=== Failure ===
Batocki visited Matthias Erzberger in Weimar on June 20, 1919, where any government support for the Eastern State Movement was rejected.
