= Rudolf Oeser =

German journalist and politician (1858–1926)

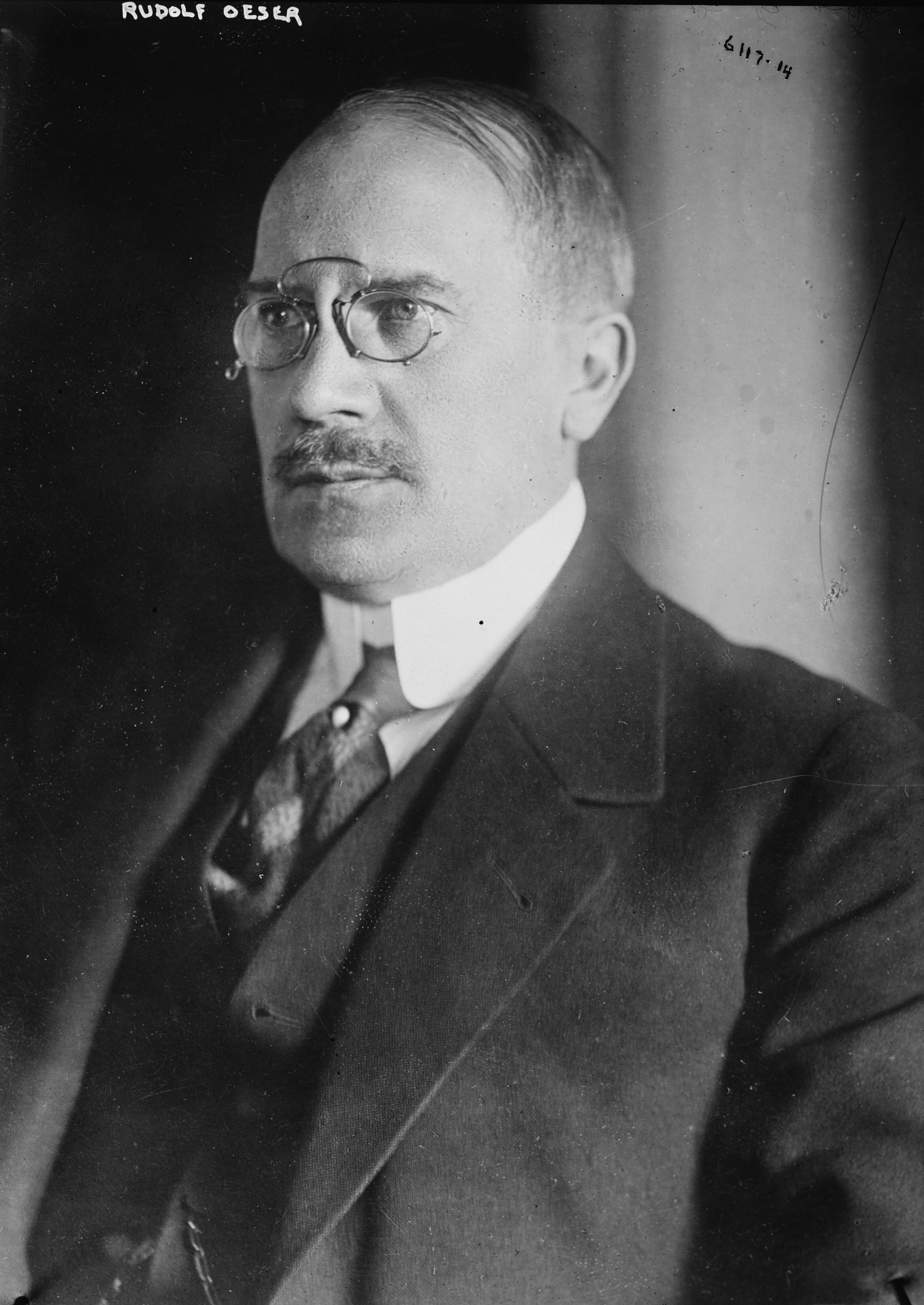

Reich Minister of Transport
- In office 13 August 1923 – 11 October 1924
- Chancellor: Gustav Stresemann; Wilhelm Marx
- Preceded by: Wilhelm Groener
- Succeeded by: Rudolf Krohne

Reich Minister of the Interior
- In office 22 November 1922 – 12 August 1923
- Chancellor: Wilhelm Cuno
- Preceded by: Adolf Köster
- Succeeded by: Wilhelm Sollmann

Additional positions
- 1919–1921: Prussian Minister of Public Works
- 1919–1924: Member of the Landtag of Prussia
- 1907–1911: Member of the Imperial Reichstag

Personal details
- Born: 13 November 1858 Coswig, Anhalt-Bernburg
- Died: 3 June 1926 (aged 67) Berlin, Weimar Republic
- Party: German Democratic Party
- Other political affiliations: Progressive People's Party (1910-1918)
- Spouse: Emilie
- Profession: Journalist, writer, politician

Rudolf Oeser (13 November 1858 – 3 June 1926) was a German journalist and liberal politician. From 1922 to 1924 he was a member of several governments of the Weimar Republic, serving as Minister of the Interior and Minister of Transport.

== Early life and career ==
Oeser was born on 13 November 1858 at Coswig, in the Principality of Anhalt-Bernburg as the son of a manufacturer. He worked as a book trader but then studied philosophy and economics and became a journalist. In 1890-92 he was the editor in chief of the Ulmer Zeitung and then joined the business editors of the Frankfurter Zeitung. In 1902, he became the head of the editorial team for Germany. He was a member of the German People's Party (DtVP) and then the FVP. In 1902, Oeser was elected to the Landtag of Prussia for the constituency of Frankfurt am Main. He was also a member of the Reichstag from 1907 to 1911, arguing for tax breaks for retail traders, the public control of corporate cartels and syndicates and for changes to the Prussian election law.

During World War I, Oeser joined the Deutsche Gesellschaft 1914 and in 1917 became editor of the Ostseezeitung and head of the Stettiner Druckerei (printing business) at Stettin. However, he continued to contribute articles to the Frankfurter Zeitung until the early 1920s. As the war casualties mounted, Oeser urged families to have many children and he also favoured giving women the same political and social status as men.

== Weimar Republic ==
After the end of the war, Oeser was once again a member of the Prussian diet, first of the Landesversammlung, the constituent assembly of Prussia in 1919-21 and then 1921-24 of the Landtag, this time for the German Democratic Party (DDP). After March 1919, he was also Minister for Public Works in the Prussian government, making him responsible for infrastructure including the railways.

During the Kapp-Lüttwitz Putsch of March 1920, Oeser was one of those arrested by the putschists. To prevent a strike by railway workers, Kapp wanted to release Oeser, who insisted that the other Prussian ministers should also be released. The next day, Oeser and Prussian Minister of Finance Albert Südekum demanded Kapp's resignation and threatened him with a strike by railway workers. Nevertheless, after the end of the putsch the railway workers' union asked for Oeser's dismissal, claiming he had failed to oppose the putsch vigorously enough. Oeser remained in office and was in charge of transferring control over the railways to the Reich. He then left the Prussian government in April 1921 and became Landeshauptmann (provincial head) of the Province of Saxony.

In the cabinet of Wilhelm Cuno, Oeser became Reichsminister des Innern (interior minister) in November 1922. As a staunch democrat and republican, Oeser was a firm supporter of the Weimar Constitution. During the Occupation of the Ruhr, Oeser hoped for France to incur material losses through a devaluation of the franc. He supported the policy of passive resistance, despite the damaging effect it had on the German economy, thinking it might be used not just to end the Ruhrkampf but also to achieve a revision of the much-despised Treaty of Versailles.

After the Cuno cabinet resigned in August 1923, Oeser took over the Reich Transport Ministry (Reichsverkehrsministerium) in the cabinet of Gustav Stresemann. In the coalition crisis of November 1923 he favoured an exit by the Social Democrats from the cabinet but overestimated their willingness to tolerate a minority government. In the subsequent cabinet of Wilhelm Marx Oeser prepared the Reichsbahn for its independence as a formally private institution. In early April 1924, Reichspräsident Friedrich Ebert named Oeser as temporary general director of the Reichsbahn, supported by a provisonary board of directors made up of the ministries secretaries of state. To serve its intended role under the Dawes Plan, the Reichsbahn required a supervisory board among whose members were some foreigners. Oeser defended this constellation in the Reichstag against attacks from the NSDAP and DNVP. At the end of September, the supervisory board of the Reichsbahn designated Oeser as general director. He left the cabinet formally on 11 October and concentrated on reforming the Reichsbahn.

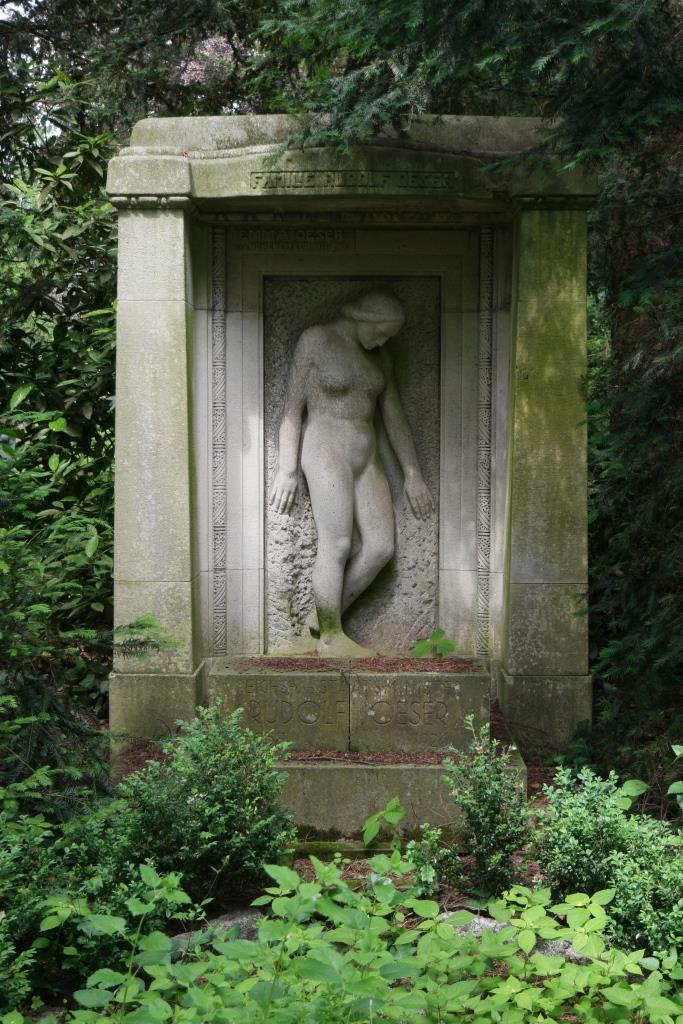
Grave of Rudolf Oeser

In 1925, he became seriously ill and died on 3 June 1926 in Berlin. Oeser had been married to Emilie Oeser.

== Works ==
- Die Besteuerung des Kleinhandels durch Umsatz-, Branchen-, Filial-, Personal-, usw. Steuern sowie die Lage des Kleinhandels und die Mittel zu ihrer Besserung, 1899/1901
- Wie stellen wir uns zu den Kartellen und Syndikaten?, 1902
- Mehr Kinder – mehr Erben! Die Bedeutung der biologischen Erbwerte für Kinder und Volk, Zeitgemäße Betrachtungen, 1918
- Unsere Kinder – unsere Zukunft (with a foreword by Erich Ludendorff), 1918
