= Preferred charge =

A preferred charge is an interim step in the United States' military justice system.

According to Jonathan Turley, a law professor at George Washington University, testifying before the Senate Intelligence Committee, the US military justice system equivalent of a formal charge is only leveled following the recommendation of an article 32 hearing -- a hearing held under the authority of article 32 of the Uniform Code of Military Justice.
