= Wilhelm Kleinmann =

German railroad administrator and Nazi official

State Secretary Reich Ministry of Transport
- In office 12 February 1937 – 26 May 1942
- Preceded by: Position created
- Succeeded by: Albert Ganzenmüller

Deputy General Director Deutsche Reichsbahn
- In office 25 July 1933 – 26 May 1942
- Preceded by: Wilhelm Weirauch
- Succeeded by: Albert Ganzenmüller

Personal details
- Born: 29 May 1876 Barmen, Rhine Province, Kingdom of Prussia, German Empire
- Died: 16 August 1945 (aged 69) Posen (today, Poznań), Soviet Occupation Zone
- Party: Nazi Party
- Education: Technische Universität Berlin; University of Hanover
- Occupation: Civil servant Railway executive

Military service
- Allegiance: German Empire
- Branch/service: Imperial German Army
- Years of service: 1914–1918
- Unit: 8th Rhenish Pioneer Battalion
- Commands: First World War
- Awards: Iron Cross, 1st and 2nd class

Wilhelm Otto Max Kleinmann (29 May 1876 – 16 August 1945) was a German railway official and politician. From 1933 to 1942 he was Deputy General Director of the Deutsche Reichsbahn and, from 1938 to 1942, a State Secretary in the Reich Ministry of Transport. At the end of the Second World War, he was captured by Soviet forces and was declared to have died in captivity.

== Early life ==
Kleinmann was born in Barmen (today, part of Wuppertal) in 1876 and studied civil engineering at the Technische Hochschulen in Charlottenburg and Hanover between 1896 and 1900. After passing his required state construction manager examination, he worked from 1904 to 1914 in the service of the Prussian State Railways at the railway directorates in Elberfeld, Strasbourg and Saarbrücken. During the First World War, he served with the 8th Rhenish Pioneer Battalion and was deployed on the eastern front, from 1916 as head of operations at Military Railway Directorate 9 in Bucharest. He was awarded the Iron Cross, 1st and 2nd class.

== Career in the Reichsbahn ==
After the war, Kleinmann between 1919 and 1920 was on special assignment in Moscow and St. Petersburg and then in the German legation in Vilnius attempting to secure railroad materials left behind in Lithuania and Latvia. In 1920, he worked first at the railway directorate in Kattowitz (today, Katowice) and, after its transfer to Poland, from 1922 in the Oppeln (today, Opole) directorate under directorate president Julius Dorpmüller, who would later go on to become Reichsbahn General Director and Reich Minister of Transportation. In January 1923, Kleinmann became head of Reichsbahn operations in Essen, and in 1924 he was appointed a Director of the Reichsbahn. In Essen, Kleinmann became involved with members of the Nazi Party and became their representative in transport matters. He formally joined the Party (membership number 663,996) on 1 October 1931.

Following the Nazi seizure of power, Kleinmann became the head of the Party's leadership staff on Reichsbahn matters in the office of Deputy Führer Rudolf Hess, where he operated as the Party's liaison to the Reichsbahn. He also was appointed President of the Reichsbahn directorate in Cologne on 1 June 1933. On 25 July, he replaced Wilhelm Weirauch as Deputy General Director of the Reichsbahn under newly appointed General Director Dorpmüller. He also was made chief of railway security. The Reichsbahn leadership was expected to implement the policies of Adolf Hitler with regard to the dismissal of Jews and Social Democrats, and the filling of key positions with reliable Nazis. Kleinmann undertook actions to purge the management of the Reichsbahn of employees who were considered unreliable by the Party.

On 2 October 1933, Kleinmann was named as a founding member of Hans Frank's Academy for German Law. On 28 October 1936, he was made president of the examination office for higher engineering administrators. On 12 February 1937, he was brought on as a new State Secretary in the Reich and Prussian Ministry of Transportation, following Dorpmuller's appointment as the new minister. Hermann Göring, the Prussian Minister president, then appointed Kleinmann to the Prussian State Council. At the same time, he was appointed to the General Council of Göring's Four-Year Plan and served as the leader of its transport work group. On 30 January 1938, the fifth anniversary of the regime coming to power, Kleinmann was awarded the Golden Party Badge. From 1939 to 1944 he was a member of the Circle of Friends of the Reichsführer-SS, Heinrich Himmler. In February 1942, the Technische Hochschule Darmstadt awarded him an honorary doctorate of engineering.

== Paramilitary membership ==
Kleinmann joined the Sturmabteilung (SA), the Party's paramilitary organization, on 22 September 1933 with the rank of SA-Standartenführer and was assigned to the Supreme SA leadership. He advanced to SA-Oberführer on 5 June 1934 and to SA-Brigadeführer on 20 April 1936. He was promoted to SA-Gruppenfuhrer on 1 May 1937 and to SA-Obergruppenführer on 30 January 1942. Kleinmann also held the rank of NSFK-Gruppenfuhrer in the National Socialist Flyers Corps from 8 October 1938.

== Dismissal ==
After the harsh winter of 1941–1942 on the Russian front, the German railways had not yet recovered, and the rail lines deep into the rear of the German positions were still clogged with backed-up freight cars. Transport of needed war material to the front was subjected to significant delays. In May 1942, Albert Speer, the recently appointed Reich Minister of Armaments and War Production, was determined to improve the situation and approached Hitler about replacing the 65-year-old Kleinmann with Albert Ganzenmüller, a young 37-year-old railway inspector who recently had successfully restored rail traffic between Minsk and Smolensk. Hitler was impressed and agreed to the change. Dorpmüller wanted to retain Kleinmann, but he was not consulted and was presented with a fait accompli. Kleinmann was relieved of his posts on 26 May 1942 and was replaced by Ganzenmüller. Kleinmann was then made General Director of Mitropa, a catering company that managed dining and sleeping cars, where he would serve out the rest of the war.

== Death ==
At the end of the war in Europe in May 1945, Kleinmann was thought to have been seized in Berlin by the Red Army and taken to an internment camp near Posen (today, Poznań). His wife had him first reported missing and later declared dead. The assumed date of his death is 16 August 1945.

== Sources ==
- Gottwaldt, Alfred; Schulle, Diana (2007). Juden ist die Benutzung von Speisewagen untersagt: Die antijüdische Politik des Reichsverkehrsministeriums zwischen 1933 - 1945. Düsseldorf: Hentrich & Hentrich. ISBN 978-3-938-48564-4.
- Klee, Ernst (2007). Das Personenlexikon zum Dritten Reich. Wer war was vor und nach 1945. Frankfurt-am-Main: Fischer-Taschenbuch-Verlag. ISBN 978-3-596-16048-8.
- Lilla, Joachim (2005). Der Perußische Staatsrat 1921–1933: Ein biographisches Handbuch. Düsseldorf: Droste Verlag. ISBN 978-3-770-05271-4.
- Speer, Albert (1970). Inside the Third Reich. New York: Avon Books. ISBN 978-0-380-00071-5.
- Wilhelm Kleinmann entry in Das Deutsche Führerlexikon 1934-1935
