= Erich Neumann =

Erich Neumann may refer to:

- Erich Neumann (politician) (1892–1948 or 1951), Nazi politician
- Erich Neumann (psychologist) (1905–1960), psychologist and writer

== See also ==
- Erich Naumann (1905–1951), German Nazi SS officer and war criminal
