= Karl Eberhard Schöngarth =

German Nazi SS general and war criminal (1903–1946)

- Born: 22 April 1903; Leipzig, Germany
- Died: 16 May 1946 (aged 43); Hamelin Prison, Hamelin, Germany
- Occupation: Lawyer
- Known for: Wannsee Conference participant Massacre of Lwów professors
- Political party: Nazi Party
- Status: Executed by hanging
- Motive: Nazism
- Conviction: War crimes
- Penalty: Death

Details
- Victims: 10,000+
- Span of crimes: 1941–1945
- Country: Poland and Netherlands
- Military career
- Allegiance: Weimar Republic; Nazi Germany
- Branch: Reichswehr; Schutzstaffel
- Service years: 1924; 1933–1945
- Rank: SS-Brigadeführer
- Commands: Einsatzgruppe z.b.V (1941); SiPo & SD Commander, General Government (1941–1943); SiPo & SD Commander (1944–1945) & Acting HSSPF (1945), Netherlands
- Awards: War Merit Cross, 1st and 2nd class, with Swords

Karl Eberhard Schöngarth (22 April 1903 – 16 May 1946) was a German lawyer and SS-Brigadeführer in Nazi Germany. He was a war criminal who perpetrated mass murder and genocide in German-occupied Poland during the Holocaust. He participated in the January 1942 Wannsee Conference, at which the genocidal Final Solution to the Jewish Question was originally planned.

After the war, Schöngarth and six others were tried for murdering an American pilot, Americo S. Galle, who was shot down over the Netherlands in November 1944. They were all found guilty. Schöngarth and four others were sentenced to death and executed in 1946.

== Early life ==
Schöngarth was born on 22 April 1903 in Leipzig, the son of a master brewer. He displayed ethno-nationalistic sentiments at an early age. He began high school at the age of 11 but, after the outbreak of the First World War, dropped out of school in order to work at a garden center to support the war effort. On 7 March 1918, Schöngarth was awarded a Young Men's Iron Medal.

After the war, he was to go back to high school to complete his education, but instead joined a Freikorps paramilitary group in Thuringia. He participated in the Kapp Putsch in 1920 and, in 1922, he joined the Nazi Party Ortsgruppe (local group) in Erfurt (membership number 43,870) and the Viking League. That year he also joined the Sturmabteilung (SA), the Nazi paramilitary organization, earned his Abitur and obtained a job as a bank teller at Deutsche bank. Following the failed Beer Hall Putsch, Schöngarth fled to Coburg to avoid a charge of treason but eventually returned to Erfurt and was granted amnesty.

By 1924, as Schöngarth's involvement with the Nazi Party waned, he briefly served in the Reichswehr Infantry Regiment 1/15 in Gießen and then enrolled at Leipzig University, majoring in economics and law. He joined a Student Corps, Corps Germania, and continued his studies at the University of Greifswald and the University of Halle. He completed his first state legal examination in July 1928 and entered on his legal clerkship in the Erfurt district court and the Naumburg regional court. He then went on to acquire his doctorate in law from the Institute for Labor Law at the University of Leipzig on 28 June 1929 at the age of 26, and was awarded a cum laude. His thesis was on the subject of "the refusal of notices of termination of employment contracts". He passed his second state legal examination in June 1932 and worked as an Assessor and assistant magistrate in Magdeburg, Erfurt and Torgau.

In 1935, he married Dorothea Gross, with whom he had two sons.

== SS career ==
=== Gestapo official ===
After becoming a court official, Schöngarth began involving himself more heavily in the Nazi Party. On 1 March 1933 he joined the SS (member number 67,174), rejoined the Nazi Party (membership number 2,848,857), and was subsequently appointed as a postmaster in Erfurt. He left his postmaster position on 1 November 1935 when he joined the Prussian Gestapo in Berlin, and was assigned to the main press office and the political-church office. It is unclear how he obtained this post, but a letter from then SS-Gruppenführer Reinhard Heydrich to the Reich Ministry of the Interior recommending him, suggests that Heydrich was his patron. Schöngarth also was named as a government counselor (Regierungsrat) in April 1936.

In November 1936, he became a member of the Sicherheitsdienst (SD), the SS intelligence service, in the SD Hauptamt (later, the Reich Security Main Office) under Heydrich. Over the next few years, he was assigned as the Gestapo commander in Arnsberg (1936–1937), Bielefeld (1937), Dortmund (early 1938) and Münster (March 1938–October 1939). Advanced to senior government councilor (Oberregierungsrat) in April 1939, his next assignment, from December 1939 to January 1941, was as the Inspector for the Sicherheitspolizei (SiPo; Security Police) and SD in Wehrkreis (military district) IV, headquartered in Dresden.

On 20 November 1940, he was named to succeed Bruno Streckenbach as the Befehlshaber der Sicherheitspolizei und des SD (Commander of SiPo and SD) in the General Government. He transferred to Kraków in January 1941 to work under Higher SS and Police Leader (HSSPF) SS-Obergruppenführer Friedrich-Wilhelm Krüger.

=== Einsatzgruppe in Poland ===
For part of the time during his posting in Kraków, Schöngarth led a temporary Einsatzgruppe unit, (Einsatzgruppe z.b.V.) in eastern Galicia. In June 1941, Schöngarth, on the orders of the RSHA, deployed Wolfgang Birkner to the Bialystok District to suppress resistance.

Schöngarth was responsible for the murders of approximately 10,000 Polish Jews between July and September 1941 and the massacre of Lwów professors and their families behind the frontlines during Operation Barbarossa in the Soviet Union. The Einsatzgruppe led by Schöngarth murdered more than 5,000 Jews from the Brześć Ghetto between 10 and 12 July 1941. Schöngarth was a fanatical enemy of the Jews and utterly ruthless in his determination to carry out the executions. In Lwów, he informed officers under his command that anyone failing to carry out the execution orders would himself be shot, and that he would support any officer that shot a comrade for this failure.

=== Wannsee Conference ===
The Wannsee Conference, called to formulate the implementation of the Final Solution of the Jewish Question, took place during a fraught political atmosphere in the General Government. Hans Frank, the Governor General, was at odds with HSSPF Krüger who, though technically subordinate to Frank, was appointed by Reichsführer-SS Heinrich Himmler and took orders only from him. They had major disagreements over control of the police forces, over Jewish policy and over the issue of the protection of German ethnicity and culture. Himmler, as the Reich Commissioner for the Consolidation of German Nationhood, felt that this was solely in his purview. Heydrich, the conference organizer, wanted to ensure that the meeting ran smoothly and came to an agreement with regard to the planned actions. Due to the intense personal and political hostilities involved, Heydrich made the decision not to invite Krüger. He opted, instead, to invite Schöngarth who was less likely to clash with the representative of the General Government, Frank's deputy, State Secretary Josef Buhler.

Schöngarth attended the Wannsee Conference on 20 January 1942, along with SS-Sturmbannführer Rudolf Lange, representing the Reichskommissariat Ostland, who also had participated in the Holocaust with Einsatzgruppe A. The official minutes of the meeting (Wannsee Protocol) do not record any comments from Schöngarth who, given his recent Einsatzgruppe experience, certainly knew exactly what was being proposed and raised no objections. Despite the euphemisms used in the minutes, its author, SS-Obersturmbannführer Adolf Eichmann, testified at his trial in 1961 that the participants: "were discussing the subject quite bluntly, quite differently from the language which I had to use later in the record. During the conversation they minced no words about it at all … they spoke about methods of killing, about liquidation, about extermination."

=== Police service in Greece and the Netherlands ===
In June 1942, charges of embezzlement, corruption, plundering and art racketeering were brought against Schöngarth. Himmler decided to defer any disciplinary action in order to quell rumours of corruption in the SS. Later in 1942, disputes arose in the General Government about whether to transport to the east the Jews who were working in the armaments industry. Schöngarth agreed that they were not replaceable and he began to agree with Frank that the policy should be relaxed. Krüger complained to Himmler that Schöngarth was contravening orders and was sympathetic with the views of the civil administration. He insisted that one or the other of them had to go, because they were unable to cooperate.

In June 1943, Schöngarth was removed from his post in Poland and was replaced by SS-Oberführer Walther Bierkamp, who had led Einsatzgruppe D. Schöngarth was transferred for disciplinary reasons to an SS anti-aircraft artillery replacement regiment in Munich. This was part of a Waffen-SS unit. After a short training period, he was sent as a company commander with the 4th SS Polizei Panzergrenadier Division to Lamia in occupied Greece, where he remained until July 1944 conducting anti-partisan operations.

From early July 1944 until the German surrender, Schöngarth was again made the Commander of SiPo and SD forces, this time at The Hague in the occupied Netherlands under HSSPF SS-Obergruppenführer Hanns Albin Rauter. After Rauter was seriously wounded in an ambush by members of the Dutch resistance on the night of 6–7 March 1945, Schongarth immediately ordered mass executions in reprisal. A total of 263 Dutch citizens were executed, including 117 at Woeste Hoeve, the location of the ambush. On 10 March, Schöngarth was deputized to act as HSSPF for Rauter while he recovered from his wounds. During the course of the war, Schöngarth was awarded the War Merit Cross, 1st and 2nd class with Swords. After the surrender of German forces in the Netherlands, Schöngarth was taken into custody by British troops.

== Trial and execution ==
After an investigation, British occupation authorities charged Schöngarth with the murder of Americo S. Galle, an American pilot. On 21 November 1944, Galle's plane had been shot down in Enschede. He was captured by German soldiers, taken to a villa which the SD was using in Enschede, and made to change from his uniform into civilian clothes.

The charge came after several Dutch people came forward and told British investigators that they had seen Galle's plane being shot down. Galle had been captured alive, but was later escorted into the woods, after which the witnesses said they heard a gunshot. Schöngarth issued an order to kill Galle.

Several hours later, a car was driven to the area. Erwin Knop (born 16 August 1905), the commander of the local SiPo and the head of a local Einsatzkommando in Enschede, emerged. He was accompanied by Untersturmführer Wilhelm Hadler (born 14 February 1898) and Unterscharführer Herbert Gernoth (born 12 January 1906), both of whom were subordinates to Knop. Knop took Galle into the car. He was followed by Scharführer Erich Lebing, 56, and Waffen-SS Oberscharführer Fritz Boehm, 28, both of whom were attached to the local SD. Obersturmführer Friederich Beeck (born 5 August 1886), the head of the Enschede villa, supervised the execution, choosing a burial site and ordering a grave to be dug. Lebing drove the car into the woods and kept watch as the others prepared to carry out the execution. Knop told Galle in English what was happening, to which the airman responded by being "very downhearted." Hadler and Gernoth dug a shallow grave, after which the rest of the group arrived. Hadler and Gernoth then escorted Galle from the car to the grave, where Gernoth shot him in the back of the neck.

Schöngarth, Beeck, Knop, Gernoth, Hadler, Lebing, and Boehm were tried by a British military court in Burgsteinfurt in February 1946. At the time, neither Galle's identity nor his nationality were known, so the defendants were charged with murdering an "unknown Allied airman." During his trial, Schöngarth's crimes in Poland were never mentioned, while his crimes in the Netherlands were only briefly discussed.

- "During your period in Holland, how many executions in all did you have to order or sanction?"
- "At the time of that interrogation I thought it would be about 150 to 200 cases, but they were all executions after proper sentences; they were only civilians who were sentenced to death on account of their disturbing order; and that was an order from the Reichskommissar."

Schöngarth denied any involvement in Galle's death. However, all of Schöngarth's codefendants said they had been following his orders. The lawyer for Schöngarth's codefendants accused him of trying to force the blame onto his men.

- "I put it to you that the real truth of what happened on the 21st November is this: a British or American airman landed in the grounds of the Villa and was captured by your men. You yourself decided that he was to be shot. You yourself ordered Knop to have him shot. You then went away in your car leaving your men to take the responsibility, and now that they stand in peril you, their commander, are trying to save your life at their expense."
- "No."

On 11 February 1946, all of the defendants were found guilty. The defense of superior orders was rejected, with five of those convicted being sentenced to death, including Schöngarth. Lebing and Boehm avoided death sentences after using different defenses. Lebing claimed he hadn't realized that Galle was a POW until it was too late since he was wearing civilian clothing. Boehm claimed ignorance and disgust over the execution, and said he'd tried to stop it from happening. Lebing was sentenced to 15 years in prison and Boehm was sentenced to 10 years in prison. After the trial was over, two Dutchmen found Galle's notebook, which showed that he was an American.

Schöngarth and his condemned accomplices were all executed by hanging by Albert Pierrepoint at Hamelin Prison on 16 May 1946. Also hanged on the same day for unrelated crimes at Hamelin were Bruno Tesch and Karl Weinbacher.

While awaiting execution, Schöngarth was interviewed by a Dutch investigator. He was asked about suspected war criminal Pieter Menten and atrocities in which he was suspected of involvement. At the end of the interview, the investigator asked Schöngarth if he was telling the truth, he replied "You know, I have only three weeks to live. That's the whole truth." Shortly before his execution, Schöngarth was visited by Menten; the two turned out to be close friends. Schöngarth told Menten he'd done him many favours in the past. He made Menten promise to look out for his family, after which he gave him legal advice.

== SS and police ranks ==
SS and police ranks
| Date | Rank |
|---|---|
| 9 November 1936 | SS-Untersturmführer |
| 30 January 1938 | SS-Obersturmführer |
| 20 April 1938 | SS-Hauptsturmführer |
| 1 August 1938 | SS-Sturmbannführer |
| 10 September 1939 | SS-Obersturmbannführer |
| 1 January 1940 | SS-Standartenführer |
| 30 January 1941 | SS-Oberführer |
| 1 March 1941 | Oberst der Polizei |
| 30 January 1943 | SS-Brigadeführer und Generalmajor der Polizei |

== Fictional portrayals ==
- In the 1984 German television film Die Wannseekonferenz, Schöngarth was played by Gerd Rigauer.
- In the 2001 BBC/HBO film Conspiracy, Schöngarth was played by Peter Sullivan.
- In the 2022 German television film Die Wannseekonferenz, Schöngarth was played by Maximilian Brückner.

== Sources ==
- Bartrop, Paul R.; Grimm, Eve E. (2019). Perpetrating the Holocaust: Leaders, Enablers, and Collaborators. ABC-CLIO. ISBN 978-1-440-85896-3.
- Dr. Eberhard Schongarth (1903–1946) in the House of the Wannsee Conference Memorial and Education Site
- Federlein, Norman; Webb, Chris (2008). Dr Eberhard Karl Schongarth, Security Police Commander in the Holocaust Education Archive and Research Team.
- Hilberg, Raul (1971). Documents of Destruction: Germany and Jewry 1933–1945. Chicago: Quadrangle Books. ISBN 978-0-812-96165-2.
- Klee, Ernst (2007). Das Personenlexikon zum Dritten Reich. Wer war was vor und nach 1945. Frankfurt-am-Main: Fischer-Taschenbuch-Verlag. ISBN 978-3-596-16048-8.
- Lehrer, Steven (2008). Wannsee House and the Holocaust. McFarland & Company. ISBN 978-0-786-44092-4.
- Löschke, Olaf (2017). "Eberhard Schongarth, Reich Main Security Office: A Practitioner of Mass Murder". In Jasch, Hans-Christian; Kreutzmüller, Christoph (eds.). The Participants: The Men of the Wannsee Conference. New York: Berghahn Books. ISBN 978-1-785-33671-3.
- Yerger, Mark C. (1997). Allgemeine-SS: The Commands, Units and Leaders of the General SS. Schiffer Publishing Ltd. ISBN 0-7643-0145-4.
