= Ingeburg Werlemann =

Secretary of Adolf Eichmann

Ingeburg Gertrud Werlemann (also Ingeburg Gertrud Wagner) (28 April 1919 – 12 September 2010) was a German secretary and photographer. During the Second World War, she was a secretary to Adolf Eichmann and noted down the results of the talks at the Wannsee Conference in Berlin on 20 January 1942.

== Life ==
After training as a secretary and stenographer, she worked for various state institutions. She had been a member of the NSDAP since September 1938. At the beginning of March 1940, she joined the Reich Security Main Office, where she eventually worked for Eichmann. In June 1944, she married Heinz Wagner, an officer in the Wehrmacht. She was interned in the Soviet occupation zone from 1945 to 1948. Soon after, she divorced her husband.

From April 1951, Ingeburg Wagner lived in Bonn, where she worked as a businesswoman and photographer. Later she moved to Garmisch-Partenkirchen. Already during her internment in Soviet Special Camp No. 7, she met Käte Werth and formed a relationship with her that lasted until her death. After the Bundestag passed the Civil Partnership Act in 2001, she entered into an officially registered partnership with Werth.

== Wannsee conference ==
At the conference, high-ranking representatives of the party and the state coordinated the persecution and murder of the European Jews. In addition to them, a typist was also present, as Eichmann later stated in his trial. On the basis of her notes, Eichmann later wrote the minutes of the results in consultation with Heydrich. By fortunate circumstances, a copy of this has been preserved and is today considered an important source on the Holocaust.

Among other things, it can be concluded from a witness statement by Wagner (Werlemann) in 1962 that she took notes at that conference. She was neither charged nor convicted, according to historian Marcus Gryglewski. He sees Wagner as an example of how German post-war society was hardly interested in dealing with national socialist crimes, legally or otherwise. On top of that, there was a lack of awareness of female perpetrators and desk-top perpetrators. But according to a later decision of the German Federal Court of Justice, one could also support a killing machine without having killed directly.

== Media portrayal and gender of the secretary ==
The identity of the secretary is not totally undisputed. The 2001 British-American film Conspiracy features a male stenographer, played by Simon Markey. Alex J.Kay in 2019 defended this choice because Eichmann at his trial had "expressly stated that the stenographer had been male."

Christian Mentel on the other hand follows the theory that Werlemann was the note taking secretary, and on the website of the present day museum of the Wannsee conference house, Wolfgang Benz briefly mentions an "unknown female secretary" (einer unbekannten Sekretärin) that helped Eichmann with the notes.

The secretary was portrayed by Anita Mally (credited as "secretary") in a 1984 German TV film and by Lilli Fichtner in the 2022 version (credited as "Ingeburg Werlemann"). In both versions, the secretary takes notes by hand.
