= Desk murderer =

Planners and organisers of mass murders

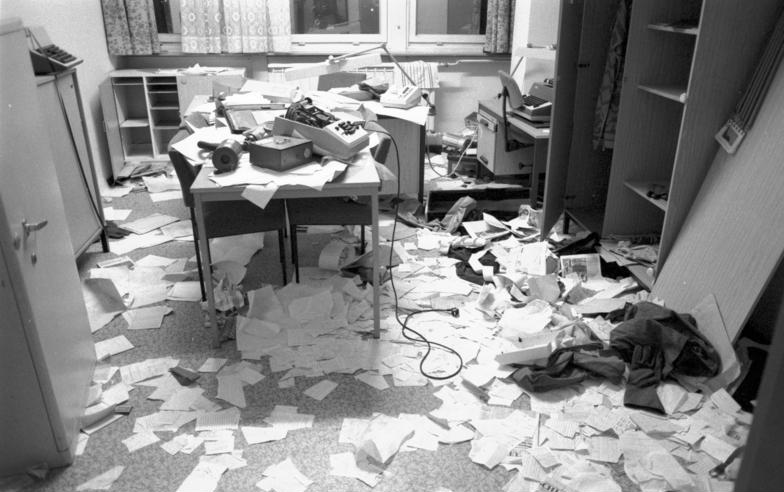
Desk and papers in disarray after the 1990 occupation of the headquarters of the Ministerium für Staatssicherheit (Stasi) of the German Democratic Republic, now a museum

The term "desk murderer" (German: Schreibtischtäter) is attributed to Hannah Arendt and is used to describe state-employed mass murderers like Adolf Eichmann, who planned and organised the Holocaust without taking part in killings personally.

The German translation of the term, Schreibtischtäter, was listed as one of the 100 most significant words in the German language in the 20th century and dates from around the same time as the English version. In the early 1970s the word Schreibtischtäter was included in the German standard dictionary, the Duden.

== History ==
The planning of the Holocaust, the genocide of the Jews, had one of its key points at the Wannsee Conference in January 1942. Only two of the participants actually took part in any killings. The other participants were involved in the planning and organisation of the Holocaust. This second group of officials was later classified as "desk murderers"; of this group, Adolf Eichmann was seen as the prototype of a desk murderer. Despite his designation as a desk murderer, Eichmann did leave his desk and office and traveled to extermination camps such as Sobibor, Auschwitz and Treblinka, becoming actively involved and knowing exactly what went on there. For this reason, some modern historians such as Bettina Stangneth dispute that Eichmann was a desk murderer, as he took too active an interest in the process of the Holocaust.

Maurice Papon, responsible for the deportation of Jews from France during the German occupation, was, like Eichmann, seen as a stereotypical desk murderer and, like Eichmann, long escaped justice. Heinrich Müller, chief of the Gestapo and Eichmann's superior, described by British historian Robert S. Wistrich as somebody who made mass murder into an administrative task, was another high-ranking desk murderer during World War II.

Hannah Arendt, who reported on Eichmann's trial for The New Yorker, published Eichmann in Jerusalem in 1963, a book sometimes falsely credited with being the source of the term "desk murderer". In this book she described him and his associates as the "modern, state-employed mass murderers" and talks of the "bureaucracy of murder". She first used the term "desk murderer" in early 1965 but this was not translated into German at the time and she herself did not use Schreibtischtäter in any of her German language publications. She used the term "desk murderer" in an English introduction to the report by German journalist Bernd Naumann on the Frankfurt Auschwitz trials in 1966 and, from there, it was translated to the German Schreibtischtäter.

The German origin of "desk murder" dates from 1964, when the Frankfurter Allgemeine Zeitung used the term for the first time.

== Criminal responsibility ==
Under West German criminal law, a distinction is made between those who order murder and those who commit murder on their own initiative. Desk murderers who pass on orders from above would therefore be guilty only as accomplices to murder, but if they ordered any murders, they would be fully liable for them even if someone else carried them out. Some people, including lawyer Jan Schlöss, have recommended reducing the scope of the term "desk murderer" to those who directly ordered murders. Others use the term to refer to anyone who was part of the bureaucracy engaged with carrying out criminal orders, no matter how indirect their involvement. One example is Ingeburg Werlemann, who took notes at the ill-famed Wannsee Conference of 1942.

== Other use ==
The term "desk murderer" has also been used in non-Holocaust contexts, such as during the Auschwitz trial when the defence lawyer Hans Laternser demanded the arrest of witness Erich Markowitsch, an Auschwitz survivor and East German politician, for his alleged role in approving the killings of refugees attempting to escape East Germany on the Berlin Wall.

The book I YOU WE THEM - Journeys Beyond Evil: The Desk Killers in History and Today, by Dan Gretton, is a layered investigation into the phenomenon of the 'Schreibtischtäter'. I You We Them focuses beyond the intentionality of murder and examines the more complicated, and politically urgent, question of distanced killing, of how organisations and the individuals within them have been able to 'compartmentalise', to evade responsibility for their actions – whether in the rigid bureaucracies of the Third Reich or within the complex structures of corporations today. By foregrounding the role of white-collar perpetrators in the Holocaust and other historical genocides, and by highlighting the collaboration between corporations and the state in history and today, it raises urgent questions about the meaning of responsibility and the deeply problematic nature of contemporary corporate behaviour. In his book, Gretton notes that: "In the early stages of this research I used the term 'desk murderer'. However, it soon became apparent that many of the individuals who kill from their desks do not have the criminal intent to do so, therefore 'desk killer' is a more accurate term, Desk murderers do exist, but, thankfully, are very few. On the other hand, desk killers are all around us."

German far-right politician Gerhard Frey used the term Schreibtischtäter for people supporting Israel, as, in his view, they thereby became accomplices in "crimes committed there".

== See also ==
- Corpse-like obedience
- Nuremberg defense
- Little Eichmanns
- Respondeat superior
