= Georg Leibbrandt =

German Nazi Party official (1899–1982)

Reichsamtsleiter Eastern Division NSDAP Office of Foreign Affairs
- In office October 1933 – Unknown
- Preceded by: Position established

Ministerialdirektor (from May 1942) Reich Ministry for the Occupied Eastern Territories
- In office July 1941 – 10 August 1943
- Preceded by: Position established
- Succeeded by: Gottlob Berger

Personal details
- Born: Georg Johann Leibbrandt; 5 September 1899 Hoffnungsfeld, Tiraspolsky Uyezd, Kherson Governorate, Russian Empire
- Died: 16 June 1982 (aged 82) Bonn, North Rhine-Westphalia, West Germany
- Party: Nazi Party
- Education: University of Tübingen; University of Marburg; University of Leipzig (PhD)
- Profession: Civil servant, scholar
- Known for: Wannsee Conference participant

Military service
- Allegiance: Nazi Germany
- Branch/service: Kriegsmarine
- Years of service: 1943–1945
- Battles/wars: Second World War

Georg Leibbrandt (5 September 1899 – 16 June 1982) was a German interpreter, bureaucrat and ministerial official who was regarded as an expert on Russia during the Nazi era. He occupied leading foreign policy positions in the Nazi Party Office of Foreign Affairs (APA) and in the Reich Ministry for the Occupied Eastern Territories (RMfdbO). Both agencies were headed by Nazi chief ideologist Alfred Rosenberg. Leibbrandt was a participant in the 20 January 1942 Wannsee Conference and was heavily involved in the systematic extermination of the Jews during the Holocaust. In the postwar period, an investigation against Leibbrandt on suspicion of complicity in murder was discontinued; he was never charged or convicted.

== Early life ==
Leibbrandt was born to ethnic German parents in Hoffnungstal (today, Tsebrykove, Ukraine), near Odesa, in the Russian Empire. His primary language was German. He attended secondary schools in Dorpat (today, Tartu), Vero (today, Võru) and Odesa. He excelled at foreign languages, learning Greek, Latin, Russian, Ukrainian and, later, French and English. In 1918, he served as an interpreter for the German occupation troops in Ukraine. Following their withdrawal at the end of the First World War, he emigrated to Germany during the resumption of hostilities in the Ukrainian War of Independence. His experiences at this time, including the loss of family members during forced resettlements and purges, left him with a deep sense of anti-Bolshevism.

In Germany, Leibbrandt studied theology, history and philosophy at the universities of Marburg, Tübingen, and then Leipzig, where he was awarded a doctorate (Ph.D.) in 1927, writing his dissertation on Swabian emigration to Russia. While a student, he was a member of the Wingolf Christian fraternity. He earned a living as a language tutor and an interpreter for foreign visitors, and spent time in Paris and London attending lectures on international law and international relations. His doctoral advisor was Walter Goetz.

Leibbrandt traveled extensively, including visits to Canada, the U.S., Switzerland and three trips to the Soviet Union in 1926, 1928 and 1929. During his visits, he was variously represented as a doctor of philosophy, a post-graduate student, a professor of history, and an employee of the Institute for the Study of Germans Abroad (Deutsches Ausland Institut) in Stuttgart. The official purposes of his visits were the study of the history and development of German colonies in the Black Sea coastal region, and the gathering of historical information. As a result of his work, a book regarding emigrant movement of the Germans was published in Germany. Leibbrandt's talent for languages, coupled with a Rockefeller Foundation scholarship, enabled him to resume his studies in Paris and the United States from 1931 to 1933. While in the US, he actively kept contact with Germans from Russia who had also immigrated to America.

== Nazi Party career ==
=== Party Foreign Affairs Office ===
Leibbrandt's work brought him to the attention of Alfred Rosenberg, the Nazi Party's chief ideologist who headed the Party's Foreign Policy Office (APA). He requested that Liebbrandt return to Germany and offered him a position with his organization on condition that he become a Party member. His membership was approved on 20 September 1933, retroactive to 1 July, (membership number 1,976,826) and he was named head of the Eastern Division of the APA with the Party rank of Reichsamtsleiter. Liebbrandt succeeded in bringing together various associations of Russian Germans and uniting them in the League of Germans from Russia (Verband der Deutschen aus Russland). This was done to quantify their numbers, to keep track of them and to provide a pool of individuals who could be trained to perform political tasks in the east.

Within the APA, Leibbrandt was placed in charge of anti-Soviet and anti-Communist propaganda. Predicated on the Nazi ideology of German superiority, he published a series of pamphlets entitled "Bolshevism" as well as numerous articles in the Party newspaper, Völkischer Beobachter that expounded on the supposed connection between "Jewishness" and Bolshevism. He also wrote numerous speeches for Rosenberg containing strong antisemitic themes, which he also incorporated into his own presentations and writings. His chief ethnographic venture became known as the Sammlung Georg Leibbrandt (Georg Leibbrandt Collection). It compiled card indexes of all German communities in the Soviet Union. It also collected information to provide a historical explanation of, and justification for, Germany's claim to territory and dominion over German ethnic groups in the east. This laid the groundwork for the occupation and resettlement policies pursued after the invasion of the Soviet Union in June 1941. In 1938, Leibbrandt received an appointment as a Beisitzer (lay judge) at the People's Court and, in 1940, he became a lecturer at the Friedrich Wilhelm University in Berlin.

=== Reich Ministry for the Occupied Eastern Territories ===
Following the invasion of the Soviet Union, the Reich Ministry for the Occupied Eastern Territories (RMfdbO) was established on 17 July 1941 with Rosenberg as Reichsminister. He appointed Leibbrandt as Hauptabteilungsleiter (Main Department Leader) of its Political Department. By January 1942, Rosenberg recommended him for a promotion to Ministerialdirektor, which took effect in May. Leibbrandt served as the Ministry's liaison for Ukrainian, Caucasian, Russian and other groups of émigrés. He established the Sammlung Georg Leibbrandt, which developed an index of literature pertaining to Russian ethnic Germans as well as a library. Its collection was expanded by materials looted from Soviet sources, including over 65,000 volumes from Ukraine. Leibbrandt was personally involved in this plunder, examining library and archival materials in the collections taken from Ukraine by the Reichsleiter Rosenberg Taskforce.

Together with Rosenberg's deputy Alfred Meyer, Leibbrandt represented the RMfdbO at the Wannsee Conference of 20 January 1942 that planned the implementation of The Final Solution. There is no record of any comments by Leibbrandt documented in the official minutes of the meeting. However, there are indications that he was aware of the genocide taking place. At a RMfdbO meeting to discuss the treatment of so called Mischlinge that was attended by Leibbrandt nine days later, the ministry officials advocated a broad-based definition of Jewishness in order to simplify the racial selection process. Even before Wannsee, on 31 October 1941 for example, Leibbrandt had sent a letter to Hinrich Lohse, the Reichskommissar for Ostland, requesting an explanation for Lohse's order forbidding the execution of Jews in Liepāja. Lohse replied by asking whether this was "a directive to liquidate all Jews in the East" and whether this should take place "without regard to age and sex and economic interests" affecting the war economy. Leibbrandt's deputy Otto Bräutigam responded on 18 December, informing Lohse that "Economic considerations should fundamentally remain unconsidered in the settlement of the [Jewish] problem".

Leibbrandt also had ongoing conflicts with the other Reichskommissar that reported to the RMfdbO, Erich Koch of the Ukraine. Furthermore, Reichsführer-SS Heinrich Himmler had long wanted to exert more direct control over the ministry and, in the summer of 1943, he succeeded in persuading Rosenberg to replace Leibbrandt with SS Obergruppenführer Gottlob Berger. Leibbrandt left the ministry and joined the Kriegsmarine where he remained until the fall of the Nazi regime in May 1945.

== Post-war life ==
Arrested by the British, Leibbrandt was interned at the former Stalag XI-B in Fallingbostel. Released in July 1947, he was arrested again two months later and compelled to testify as a witness at the Ministries Trial of former Nazi foreign policy officials. Interrogated by Robert Kempner, U.S. Assistant Chief Counsel, Leibbrandt said he could not remember the Wannsee Conference, and alleged telling Rosenberg that he "did not share the lunacy". He remained in Allied custody until finally released in May 1949. In January 1950, he was formally investigated for being an accessory to murder by the Nuremberg-Fürth public prosecutor's office but the case was dismissed on 10 August 1950. In 1951, he underwent denazification proceedings at Kiel and he was classified as Category V, "exonerated". His attempt to obtain employment in the West German Foreign Ministry was unsuccessful.

In 1955, Leibbrandt was an adviser to German Chancellor Konrad Adenauer on the repatriation of German prisoners of war from the Soviet Union. He was employed as a lobbyist for the city of Wilhelmshaven and the Friesland district, and he later represented the steel manufacturer Salzgitter AG. He resumed his studies on the subject of Russian German communities, and remained an active member of the Landsmannschaft der Deutschen aus Russland, an association of Germans who had been expelled from Russia, until his death in Bonn on 16 June 1982.

In November 1979, the U.S. Justice Department and State Department barred Leibbrandt from entering the United States for his participation in the murder of hundreds of thousands of Jews from 1941 to 1943. His United States travel visa was revoked and his name was placed on the watch lists of the U.S. Immigration Service and State Department.

== Fictional portrayals ==
- In the 1984 German television film Die Wannseekonferenz, Leibbrandt was played by Jochen Busse
- In the 2001 BBC/HBO film Conspiracy, Leibbrandt was played by Ewan Stewart
- In the 2022 ZDF television film Die Wannseekonferenz, Leibbrandt was played by Rafael Stachowiak

== Sources ==
- Dr. Georg Leibbrandt (1899 – 1982) in the House of the Wannsee Conference Memorial and Education Site
- Georg Leibbrandt (1899 – 1982) in the Jewish Virtual Library
- Klee, Ernst (2007). Das Personenlexikon zum Dritten Reich. Wer war was vor und nach 1945. Frankfurt-am-Main: Fischer-Taschenbuch-Verlag. p. 364. ISBN 978-3-596-16048-8.
- Munke, Martin (2017). "Georg Leibbrandt, Reich Ministry for the Occupied Eastern Territories: An Academic Radical". In Jasch, Hans-Christian; Kreutzmüller, Christoph (eds.). The Participants: The Men of the Wannsee Conference. Berghahn Books. ISBN 978-1-785-33671-3.
- Miller, Michael D.; Schulz, Andreas (2017). Gauleiter: The Regional Leaders of the Nazi Party and Their Deputies, 1925–1945. Vol. 2 (Georg Joel – Dr. Bernhard Rust). R. James Bender Publishing. ISBN 978-1-932-97032-6.
