= Die Wannseekonferenz (2022 film) =

German film

- Genre: Docudrama; Historical drama
- Written by: Magnus Vattrodt; Paul Mommertz
- Directed by: Matti Geschonneck
- Starring: Philipp Hochmair; Arnd Klawitter; Johannes Allmayer
- Narrated by: Matthias Brandt
- Country of origin: Germany
- Original language: German

Production
- Producers: Friederich Oetker; Reinhold Elschot
- Cinematography: Theo Bierkens
- Running time: 108 minutes
- Production companies: Constantin Television; ZDF

Original release
- Network: ZDF
- Release: 24 January 2022

Die Wannseekonferenz, international title The Conference, is a German TV docudrama, first aired January 24, 2022 by the ZDF broadcaster, about the Wannsee Conference held in Berlin-Wannsee in 1942 to organise the extermination of the Jews.

== Background ==
Director Matti Geschonneck shows a reenactment of the real Wannsee Conference held January 20, 1942, based on a script by Magnus Vattrodt. German Nazi officials meet amidst the Second World War to determine the so-called “Final Solution to the Jewish Question”. It is not the beginning of the Shoah but it is a meeting to coordinate various government branches for carrying out the destruction of Jews.

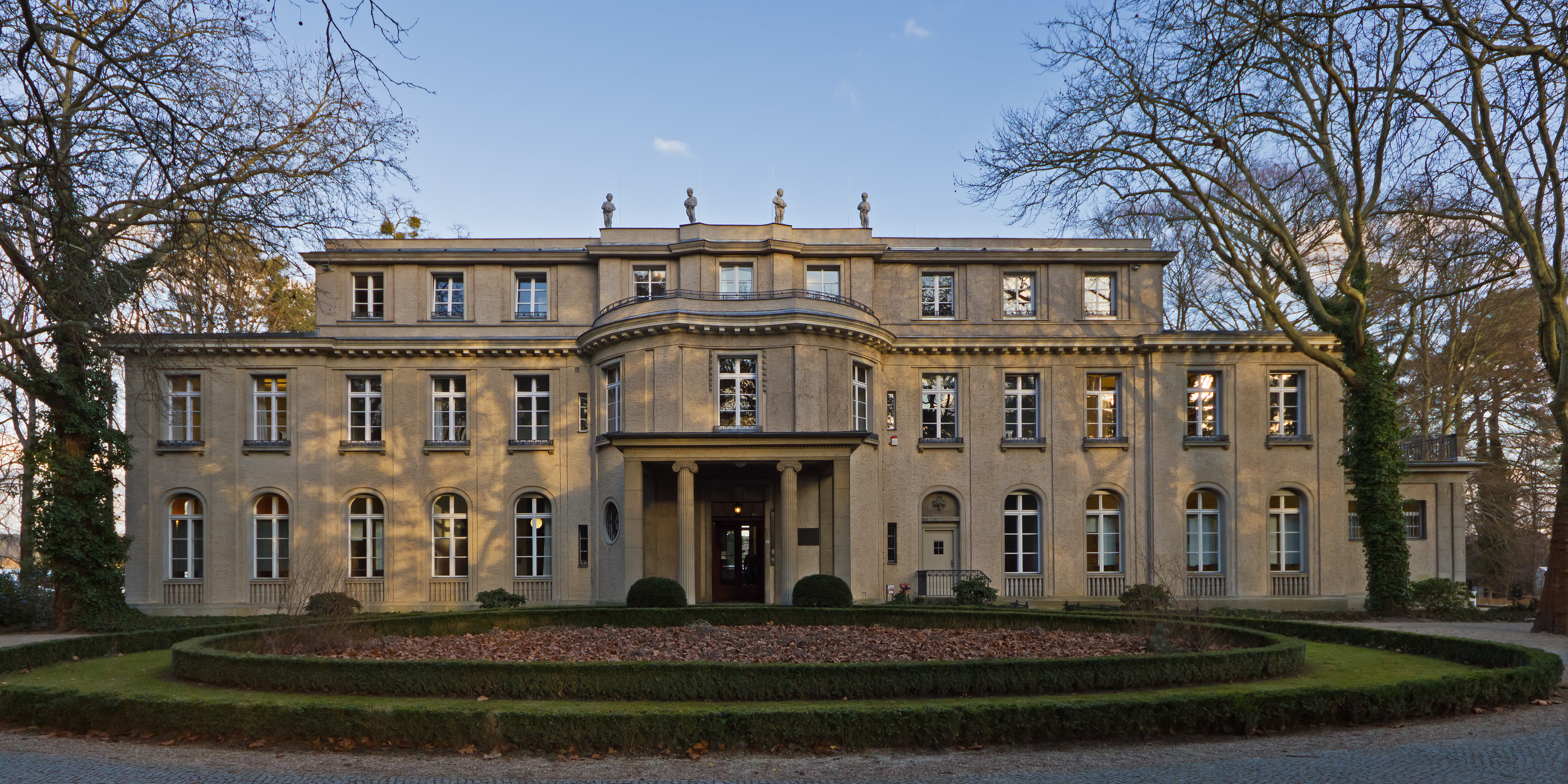
The villa Am Großen Wannsee 56–58, where the Wannsee Conference was held, is now a memorial and museum.

== Cast ==
- Philipp Hochmair as Reinhard Heydrich, Chief of the Reich Security Main Office (RSHA)
- Johannes Allmayer as Adolf Eichmann, Head of RSHA IV B4
- Sascha Nathan as Dr. Josef Bühler
- Arnd Klawitter as Dr. Roland Freisler, for the Reich Ministry of Justice
- Markus Schleinzer as Otto Hofmann
- Fabian Busch as Dr. Gerhard Klopfer
- Thomas Loibl as Friedrich Wilhelm Kritzinger
- Frederic Linkemann as Dr. Rudolf Lange
- Rafael Stachowiak as Georg Leibbrandt
- Simon Schwarz as Martin Luther
- Peter Jordan as Dr. Alfred Meyer
- Jakob Diehl as Heinrich Müller, Chief of RSHA Department IV (the Gestapo)
- Matthias Bundschuh as Erich Neumann
- Maximilian Brückner as Dr. Eberhard Schöngarth
- Godehard Giese as Wilhelm Stuckart, for the Reich Ministry for the Interior
- Lilli Fichtner as Ingeburg Werlemann
- Frederik Schmid as Eichmann's adjutant

== Reception ==
=== Critical response ===
On the review aggregator website Rotten Tomatoes, 90% of 10 critics' reviews are positive, with an average rating of 7.1/10.

=== Awards and nominations ===
German Television Award

- 2022: Best Film Made for Television
- 2022: Best Writing Fiction – Paul Mommertz and Magnus Vattrodt
- 2022: Best Actor – Philipp Hochmair (Nominee)
- 2022: Best Directing Fiction – Matti Geschonneck (Nominee)

Grimme Award

- 2023: Fiction

Barcelona-Sant Jordi International Film Festival

- 2022: Best Film

Civis Media Prize

- 2022: Entertainment (Civis Video Award)

New York Festivals TV & Film Awards

- 2022: Feature Films (Gold Award)

Romy

- 2022: Favorite Actor – Philipp Hochmair (Reinhard Heydrich)
- 2022: Best Film TV/Stream – Friederich Oetker and Reinhold Elschot
- 2022: Best Writing TV/Stream – Magnus Vattrodt and Paul Mommertz

Prix Europa

- 2022: Best European TV Film

Günter-Rohrbach-Filmpreis

- 2022: Best Film

Fernsehfilmfestival Baden-Baden

- 2022: 3sat-Publikumspreis (Audience Award)

== See also ==
- Heinz Schirk (director): The Wannsee Conference, a 1984 German TV film
- Conspiracy – a 2001 English language film
- Fatherland – an alternate history novel dealing in large part with the Wannsee Conference - 1992
- List of Holocaust films
