= Friedrich Wilhelm Kritzinger =

German lawyer and Nazi official (1890–1947)

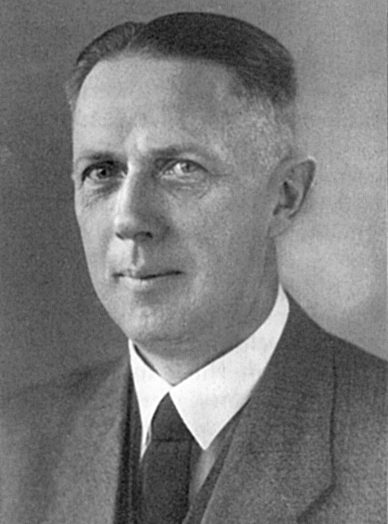

State Secretary of the Reich Chancellery
- In office 22 November 1942 – 23 May 1945
- Chancellor: Adolf Hitler; Lutz Graf Schwerin von Krosigk

Ministerial Director Reich Chancellery
- In office 1 February 1938 – 22 November 1942

Personal details
- Born: 14 April 1890 Grünfier, Province of Posen, Prussia, German Empire
- Died: 25 April 1947 (aged 57) Nuremberg, Bavaria, Allied-occupied Germany
- Party: Nazi Party (NSDAP)
- Spouse: Walti Luise Agnes Gräfin von Schwerin
- Profession: Lawyer
- Known for: Wannsee Conference participant

Military service
- Allegiance: German Empire
- Branch/service: Imperial German Army
- Years of service: 1914–1920
- Rank: Leutnant der Reserves
- Unit: Jäger Battalion #5 (1st Silesian)
- Battles/wars: First World War
- Awards: Iron Cross, 1st and 2nd class Hohenzollern Order

Friedrich Wilhelm Kritzinger (14 April 1890 – 25 April 1947) was a German lawyer who became the State Secretary in the Reich Chancellery under Reichsminister Hans Lammers in Nazi Germany. He was Lammers' representative to the 20 January 1942 Wannsee Conference, at which the genocidal Final Solution to the Jewish Question was planned. He was arrested after the fall of the Nazi regime, incarcerated from 1945 to 1947 but released due to ill health and died without ever facing trial.

== Early life and education ==
Kritzinger was born the son of a Protestant pastor in Grünfier (today, Zielonowo, Poland) in the Prussian province of Posen. He attended secondary schools in Posen (today, Poznań) and Gnesen (today, Gniezno), receiving his Abitur in 1908. He then studied law at the Albert Ludwig University of Freiburg, the Humboldt University of Berlin and the University of Greifswald. After passing the first state law examination in October 1911, he began a legal clerkship. His legal training was interrupted by his service in the First World War where he served in Jäger Battalion #5 (1st Silesian) from 1914 to 1918. He fought on the western front, attained the rank of Leutnant in the reserves and earned the Iron Cross, 1st and 2nd class and the Order of Hohenzollern. He was wounded and captured by the French and released in February 1920. In 1921, he completed his legal clerkship and passed the second state law examination.

== Weimar Republic ==
From July to September 1921, Kritzinger worked as an attorney at the Amtsgericht (district court) in Striegau (today, Strzegom). He then was employed by the Reich Ministry of Justice dealing with questions of international law. In 1925, he transferred to the Prussian Ministry of Trade and Commerce but then returned to the Reich Ministry of Justice the following year, where he was to remain until 1938. He worked as a Referent (consultant), initially on matters of international law and, from 1928, matters of constitutional law. During this time he was promoted to Regierungsrat (government councilor), Oberregierungsrat (senior government councilor) and Ministerialsrat (ministerial councilor). Kritzinger did not belong to a political party in the Weimar Republic but, according to his account, he voted for the conservative German National People's Party (DNVP) in the Reichstag elections until 1933.

== Career in Nazi Germany ==
Kritzinger welcomed the Nazi seizure of power and dismissed the street violence of those turbulent years as revolutionary excesses. While at the Justice Ministry, Kritzinger was involved in drafting legislation that supported the Nazi regime. For example, he helped to draft the legislation that established the legal basis for expropriating the property of the outlawed trade unions. After the Night of the Long Knives, he worked on a law (Law on the Measures of State Self-defense, 3 July 1934) that legitimized as acts of self-defense the extrajudicial murders of high-ranking Sturmabteilung (SA) leaders and other political opponents.

In early 1938, Kritzinger was offered the opportunity to transfer to the Reich Chancellery. Although the position involved a promotion, he hesitated when informed by the Chancellery Chief Hans Lammers that membership in the Nazi Party was a prerequisite. However, Kritzinger was encouraged to take the position by Minister of Justice Franz Gürtner. Gürtner had been a member of the DNVP and favored having his trusted colleague in the job rather than a more fanatical Nazi. On 1 February 1938, Kritzinger accepted the transfer to the Reich Chancellery as head of Division B with the civil service rank of Ministerialdirektor, and he joined the Nazi Party (membership number 4,841,517).

Kritzinger's division was in charge of matters involving the issuing of permits for exemption from the Nuremberg Laws. He also was involved with the drafting of draconian wartime legislation such as the so called Regulation Against Public Pests (Verordnung gegen Volksschädlinge) of 5 September 1939, which imposed the death penalty for acts like looting and arson. Other laws sought to further deprive the German Jewish population of its remaining rights. The 11th Regulation of the Citizenship Law (25 November 1941) stipulated that all German Jews who had emigrated retrospectively lost their German citizenship, and it provided for the confiscation of their assets. The 13th Regulation (1 July 1943) provided that the assets of German Jews would become the property of the Reich upon their death. It also transferred responsibility for any criminal proceedings against Jews from the judiciary to the police.

=== Wannsee Conference ===
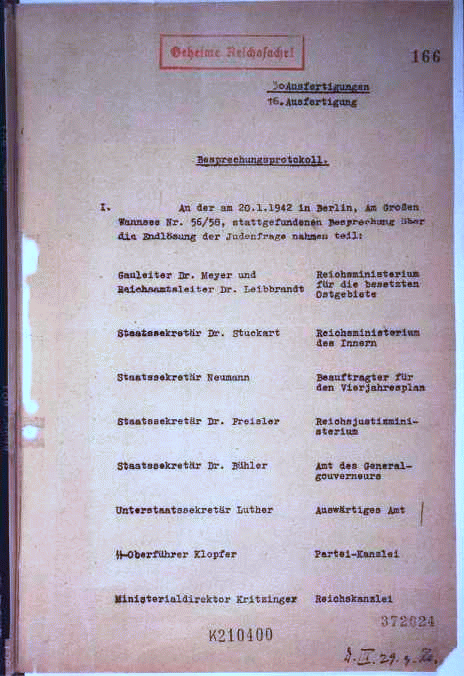
Ministerialdirektor Kritzinger of the Reich Chancellery listed as a participant in the meeting minutes of the Wannsee Conference

Kritzinger was the oldest of the participants at the Wannsee Conference of 20 January 1942, which planned the implementation of The Final Solution. There is no record of any comments by him in the official minutes of the meeting. There also is no documentation that he vocally or openly opposed the plans discussed at Wannsee, though evidence suggests that he sought to distance himself from the whole affair. He did not attend the follow-up meeting on 6 March 1942, opting to send a less senior official who was instructed not to discuss policy positions but only to report back on the meeting. This may also have been the approach taken by Kritzinger at Wannsee.

German historian Hans Mommsen claimed that Kritzinger did not see the Wannsee Conference as consequential, and described it to a colleague using a German phrase (Hornberger Schießen) meaning a greatly anticipated event that comes to nothing. In the spring of 1942, Kritzinger attempted to resign his position in the Chancellery but his resignation was refused by Lammers, who told him that things would become "much worse if you leave".

=== Later war years ===
Kritzinger stayed on at the Reich Chancellery and, as the management of the Second World War consumed more and more of Adolf Hitler's time and energy, Lammers was usually with the Führer at his military field headquarters. Consequently, Kritzinger took on more of the day-to-day operations of the Chancellery in Berlin. He was rewarded on 21 November 1942 when Hitler promoted him to State Secretary of the Chancellery, making him the senior civil servant in the staff of about seventy-five. This was a relatively small staff, considering the large amount of work it had in coordinating the activities of all the Reich ministries. The workload began to take a toll on Kritzinger's health, necessitating a six-week leave of absence in the spring of 1943 for high blood pressure and impaired vision.

Shortly before the fall of Berlin to the Red Army, Kritzinger left the city on 23 April 1945, where he had been in charge of coordinating the evacuation of the remaining ministry officials and files since 20 April. Making his way westward, he continued to serve as the Chancellery's State Secretary in the Flensburg government set up under Hitler's appointed successor, Großadmiral Karl Dönitz.

== Arrest, imprisonment and death ==
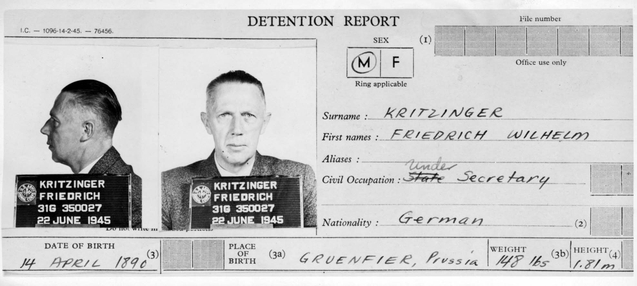
Kritzinger in American custody, June 1945

Kritzinger was arrested by British soldiers on 23 May 1945 along with the rest of the Flensburg government. Originally incarcerated at Camp Ashcan at Mondorf-les-Bains in Luxembourg, he later was transferred to Bruchsal. Kritzinger was frequently interrogated by Robert Kempner, U.S. Assistant Chief Counsel at the Nuremberg trials, and he was called as a witness. He was the only one of the Wannsee Conference participants to admit of his own accord that he had been present. He also acknowledged the criminal nature of the conference, and he testified that he had been ashamed of German politics during the war, admitting that Hitler and Heinrich Himmler were mass murderers. He told Kempner: "The worst for me was the treatment of the occupied areas and of the Jews. I was ashamed to visit the grave of my father". He was released in April 1946 but then arrested again in December. Due to health-related reasons, he was released again and died of natural causes in April 1947.

== Revocation of Kritzinger's pension ==
On 22 February 1963, the personnel office for the state of Hesse revoked the entitlement to the pension that Kritzinger's widow had been receiving for six years. The rationale cited was that Kritzinger "participated in the issuing of a number of decrees contrary to the rule of law and attended the meeting of state secretaries on 20 January 1942".

== Fictional portrayals ==
Kritzinger was portrayed by Franz Rudnick in the German television 1984 film Die Wannseekonferenz, by David Threlfall in the 2001 BBC/HBO film Conspiracy and by Thomas Loibl in the 2022 German film Die Wannseekonferenz. Kritzinger also appears as a literary figure in Robert Harris' alternative history novel Fatherland (1992).

== Sources ==
- Klee, Ernst (2007). Das Personenlexikon zum Dritten Reich. Wer war was vor und nach 1945. Frankfurt-am-Main: Fischer-Taschenbuch-Verlag. p. 342. ISBN 978-3-596-16048-8.
- Paul-Jacobs, Stefan; Kleiber, Lori (2017). "Friedrich Wilhelm Kritzinger, Reich-Chancellery: A Prussian Civil Servant Under the Nazi Regime". In Jasch, Hans-Christian; Kreutzmüller, Christoph (eds.). The Participants: The Men of the Wannsee Conference. Berghahn Books. ISBN 978-1-785-33671-3.
- Noks, Robert Jan: Friedrich Kritzinger (2022) in Traces of War
