= The Wannsee Conference (film) =

1984 film directed by Heinz Schirk

- Based on: Wannsee Conference
- Written by: Paul Mommertz
- Directed by: Heinz Schirk
- Countries of origin: Austria; West Germany
- Original language: German

Production
- Producer: Siegfried B. Glökler
- Editor: Ulla Möllinger
- Running time: 85 minutes (Germany); 87 minutes (United States)
- Production companies: Infafilm GmbH Manfred Korytowski Munich; Austrian Television-O.R.F. Bavarian Broadcasting Corp.

Original release
- Release: 1984

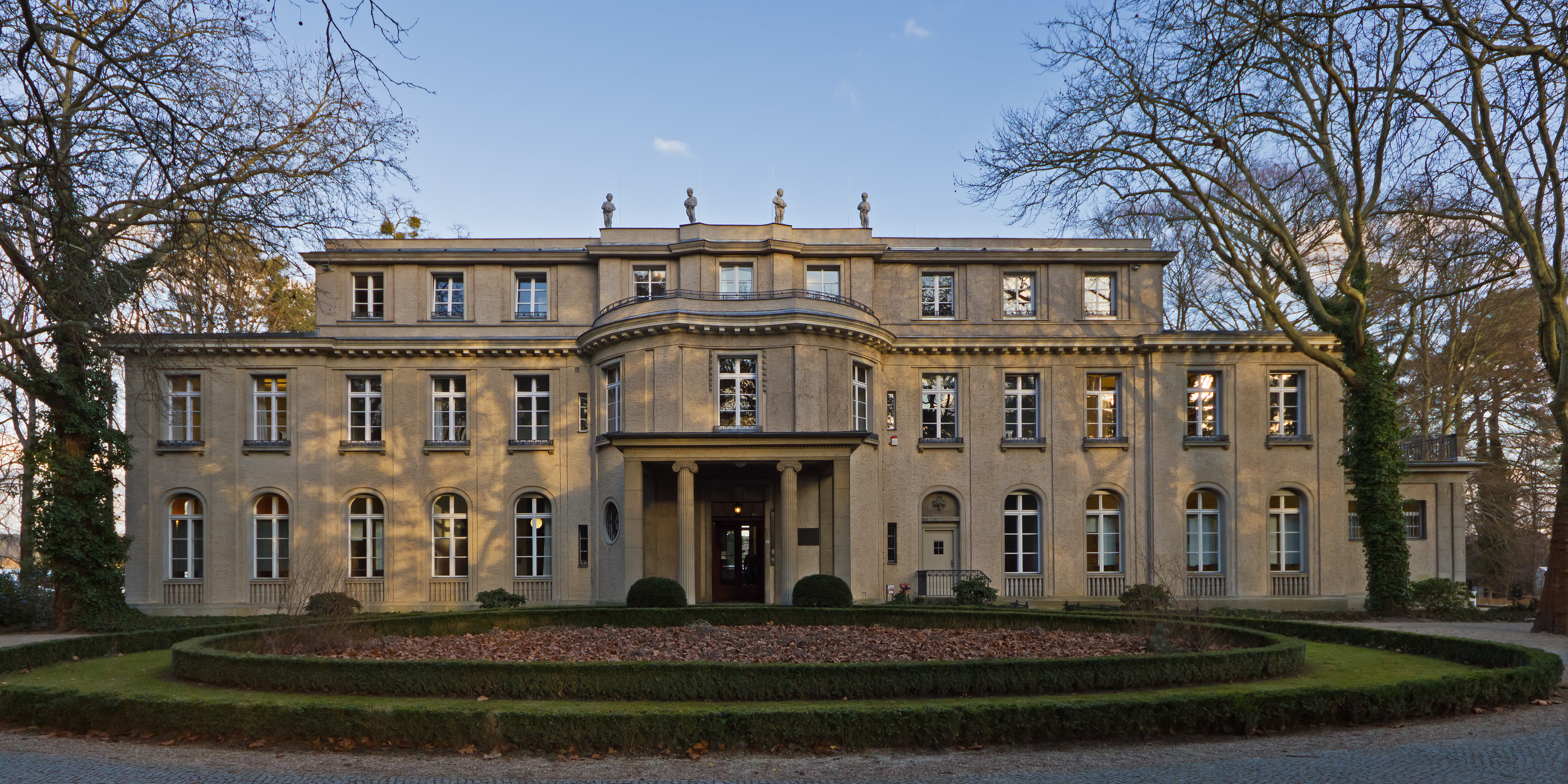
Manor in Berlin-Wannsee, Germany - also known as the House of the Wannsee Conference

The Wannsee Conference (German: Die Wannseekonferenz) is a 1984 West German - Austrian TV film portraying the events of the Wannsee Conference, held in Berlin in January 1942. The script is derived from the minutes of the meeting. Since no verbatim transcription of the meeting exists, the dialogue is necessarily fictionalised. The main theme of the film is the bureaucratic nature of the genocide.

The same events were later depicted in the 2001 English-language film Conspiracy.

== Plot ==
Set in Berlin on January 20, 1942, Die Wannseekonferenz opens with the arrival of a group of high-ranking Nazi officials at a luxurious villa on the shores of Lake Wannsee. Among the attendees are SS-Obergruppenführer Reinhard Heydrich (played by Dietrich Mattausch), SS-Obersturmbannführer Adolf Eichmann (played by Gerd Böckmann), and other key figures of the Nazi regime.

Led by Heydrich, the conference is convened ostensibly to discuss administrative matters related to the Jewish population under Nazi control. However, it soon becomes apparent that the true purpose of the meeting is to coordinate the systematic extermination of European Jews.

Heydrich outlines the logistical details of the "Final Solution," including the establishment of extermination camps and the deportation of Jews from across Europe to these facilities. The attendees engage in chillingly pragmatic discussions about the most efficient methods of mass murder, referring to Jews in dehumanizing terms.

Throughout the meeting, tensions arise among the participants, reflecting differing attitudes towards the implementation of the genocide. Some express moral qualms or concerns about the logistical challenges, while others advocate for ruthless efficiency in carrying out the plan.

As the conference progresses, Heydrich emphasizes the need for secrecy and coordination to ensure the success of the "Final Solution." The film concludes with the attendees departing from the villa, leaving Eichmann behind to oversee the implementation of the genocidal policies discussed at Wannsee.

== Cast ==
- Dietrich Mattausch as SS-Obergruppenführer Reinhard Heydrich: Chief of the Reich Security Main Office (RSHA) and Deputy Reichsprotektor of Bohemia and Moravia.
- Gerd Böckmann as SS-Obersturmbannführer Adolf Eichmann: Head of RSHA IV B4.
- Peter Fitz as Dr Wilhelm Stuckart: State Secretary, Reich Ministry for the Interior.
- Günter Spörrle as SS-Oberführer Dr Gerhard Klopfer: State Secretary, Party Chancellery.
- Hans-Werner Bussinger as Martin Luther: Undersecretary and SS liaison, Foreign Ministry.
- Franz Rudnick as Ministerialdirektor Dr Friedrich Wilhelm Kritzinger: Deputy Head, Reich Chancellery.
- Jochen Busse as Dr Georg Leibbrandt: Head of Political Department, Reich Ministry for the Occupied Eastern Territories.
- Harald Dietl as Gauleiter Dr Alfred Meyer: Deputy Reich Minister, Reich Ministry for the Occupied Eastern Territories.
- Robert Atzorn as SS-Gruppenführer Otto Hofmann: Chief of the SS Race and Settlement Main Office.
- Dieter Groest as SS-Sturmbannführer Erich Neumann: Director, Office of the Four Year Plan.
- Friedrich G. Beckhaus as SS-Gruppenführer Heinrich Müller: Chief of RSHA Department IV (the Gestapo).
- Reinhard Glemnitz as Dr Josef Bühler: State Secretary for the General Government of occupied Poland.
- Martin Lüttge as SS-Sturmbannführer Dr Rudolf Lange: Commander of the Sicherheitsdienst (SD) in Latvia.
- Rainer Steffen as Dr Roland Freisler: State Secretary, Reich Ministry of Justice.
- Gerd Rigauer as SS-Oberführer Dr Karl Eberhard Schöngarth: SD officer assigned to the General Government.
- Anita Mally, as the secretary (Ingeburg Werlemann)

== Production ==
Serge Schmemann, writing for The New York Times, details the production process behind Die Wannseekonferenz, noting its reliance on historical sources such as the Wannsee Protocol, correspondence from Hermann Göring and Adolf Eichmann, and Eichmann's testimony from his 1961 trial for war crimes in Israel. Schmemann highlights the extensive research conducted by Manfred Korytowski, a West German-Israeli television producer, who aimed to use the film as an educational tool to impart knowledge about Germany's history to younger audiences. He underscores Korytowski's commitment to authenticity, with efforts made to ensure accuracy in details such as the dialect of German spoken (reflecting Nazi-era language rather than classical German) and the props worn by actors, including pens and watches.

While Schmemann acknowledges the film's artistic vision, he asserts that its most significant aspect lies in its depiction of the profound cynicism exhibited during the Wannsee Conference. This cynicism, he contends, echoes themes explored in other German and Austrian productions of the time, which sought to confront previously overlooked or sanitized aspects of history. This movement toward confronting the past, known as Vergangenheitsbewältigung ("coming to terms with the past"), is a central theme in German historiography. However, Schmemann observes that Die Wannseekonferenz distinguishes itself from other works in this genre by its singular focus on the perpetrators and its avoidance of sentimentalism, thereby standing apart from the prevailing tendency to absolve German guilt.

== Reception ==
=== Critical Response ===
American film critic Vincent Canby, in a review published in the New York Times, praised the film. His review focused particularly on the film’s usage of camera angles, describing the camera's movements as those of a "restless impotent ghost who sees all and can do nothing." He notes that Schirk and Mommertz are clearly "intentionalists" ("the doctrine that the actual intentions of artists are relevant to the interpretation of the artworks they create").

In a critical analysis, Heinz Höhne, the editor of the German news magazine Der Spiegel, scrutinizes the film's treatment of historical events within the context of television production trends in 1980s West Germany. Höhne critiques what he perceives as an overemphasis on "Vergangenheitsbewältigung," or "coming to terms with the past," within the television landscape. He contends that the film contributes little to an already saturated market of history-themed television programming. Höhne directs particular criticism towards the director, Mommertz, for elevating the significance of Adolf Eichmann within the narrative, suggesting that Eichmann's historical role was not as pivotal as portrayed in the film.

Nicolas K. Johnson, in a master's thesis analyzing the film, highlights the significance of Höhne's review in offering an alternative interpretation of the Wannsee Protocol.

== See also ==
- Conspiracy, a 2001 English language film, about the same subject.
- Matti Geschonneck (director): Die Wannseekonferenz (The Wannsee Conference, a 2022 German TV film)
