= Conspiracy (2001 film) =

Television film by Frank Pierson

- Written by: Loring Mandel
- Directed by: Frank Pierson
- Starring: Kenneth Branagh; Stanley Tucci; Colin Firth; Ian McNeice; Kevin McNally; David Threlfall
- Composer: Dennis McCarthy
- Countries of origin: United Kingdom; United States
- Original languages: English; German

Production
- Producers: Nick Gillott; Frank Pierson
- Cinematography: Stephen Goldblatt
- Editor: Peter Zinner
- Running time: 96 minutes
- Production companies: BBC; HBO Films

Original release
- Network: HBO
- Release: 19 May 2001

Conspiracy is a 2001 made-for-television drama film that dramatises the 1942 Wannsee Conference. Using the authentic script taken from the only surviving transcript recorded during the meeting, the film explores the psychology of Nazi officials involved in the "Final Solution of the Jewish question" during World War II.

The film was written by Loring Mandel and directed by Frank Pierson. Its ensemble cast includes Kenneth Branagh, Stanley Tucci, Colin Firth and David Threlfall. Branagh won a Primetime Emmy Award for Outstanding Lead Actor, and Tucci was awarded a Golden Globe Award for his supporting role.

== Plot ==
On 20 January 1942, a conference of Nazi German officials at a villa in Wannsee is chaired by Reinhard Heydrich, chief of the Reich Security Main Office. Heydrich has been given a mandate by Reichsmarschall Hermann Göring to carry out a "complete solution of the Jewish question" by making Germany's territory free of Jews, including the occupied countries of Poland, Reichskommissariat Ostland, Czechoslovakia and France.

Heydrich, aided by SS-Obersturmbannführer Adolf Eichmann, outlines the challenges the Nazi regime faces in maintaining the Jewish population in the Reich's sphere of influence and states the government's policy will change from one of forced emigration to "evacuation," which he temporarily declines to elaborate on until an outburst from Dr. Rudolf Lange forces him to clarify that he means extermination.

The men discuss sterilisation and exemptions for mixed-race Jews who have one or more non-Jewish grandparents, causing tensions and disagreements arising from the attendees' competing interests to surface. Friedrich Wilhelm Kritzinger suggests the meeting is pointless since he believes the "Jewish question" has already been settled; Dr. Wilhelm Stuckart, a lawyer in the Reich Ministry for the Interior and co-author of the Nuremberg Laws, is angered by the administrative and legal chaos that he believes will ensue from the killings; and Dr. Josef Bühler insists that the Jews in the overpopulated ghettos under his control in occupied Poland be dealt with first. Heydrich calls a break in the proceedings, and takes Stuckart aside to warn him about the consequences of his stubbornness.

On reconvening, Heydrich announces that the method of "evacuation" will now be discussed. With Eichmann's assistance, he dismisses the others' proposed solutions, which range from chemical sterilisation to execution by firing squad, before revealing the policy that had already been decided before the meeting convened: the wholesale extermination of Europe's Jewish population using carbon monoxide gas pumped into gas chambers, with ovens later being used to incinerate the bodies. Eichmann then reveals that the SS has been building extermination camps at Belzec, Sobibor and Treblinka, and making preparations for the "Final Solution" without informing Germany's civilian bureaucracy.

Heydrich finally takes Kritzinger aside and intimidates him into giving his support. Kritzinger realizes that any hopes he had of assuring liveable conditions for the Jewish population are unrealistic and tells Heydrich a cautionary tale about a man consumed by hatred of his father, so much so that his life loses its meaning once his father dies. Heydrich then recalls and concludes the meeting, gaining explicit assent and support from each official. After giving careful instructions on the secrecy of the meeting, they adjourn. Heydrich recounts Kritzinger's story to Müller and Eichmann over drinks and reveals he believes it was meant to warn them that a similar fate awaits Germany once Europe's Jews have been murdered. He dismisses the concern and declares he "will not miss them."

As the officials depart, a brief account of their fates is given. A post-script reveals that German Foreign Office secretary Martin Luther's copy of the Wannsee minutes, recovered by the US Army in the archives of the Foreign Office in 1947, was the only record of the conference to survive.

== Cast ==
- Kenneth Branagh as SS-Obergruppenführer Reinhard Heydrich: Chief of the Reich Security Main Office (RSHA) and Deputy Reichsprotektor of Bohemia and Moravia.
- Stanley Tucci as SS-Obersturmbannführer Adolf Eichmann: Head of RSHA IV B4.
- Colin Firth as SS-Brigadeführer Dr Wilhelm Stuckart: State Secretary, Reich Ministry for the Interior.
- Ian McNeice as SS-Oberführer Dr Gerhard Klopfer: State Secretary, Party Chancellery.
- Kevin McNally as Martin Luther: Undersecretary and SS liaison, Foreign Ministry.
- David Threlfall as Ministerialdirektor Friedrich Wilhelm Kritzinger: Deputy Head, Reich Chancellery.
- Ewan Stewart as Dr Georg Leibbrandt: Head of Political Department, Reich Ministry for the Occupied Eastern Territories.
- Brian Pettifer as Gauleiter Dr Alfred Meyer: Deputy Reich Minister, Reich Ministry for the Occupied Eastern Territories.
- Nicholas Woodeson as SS-Gruppenführer Otto Hofmann: Chief of the SS Race and Settlement Main Office.
- Jonathan Coy as SS-Sturmbannführer Erich Neumann: Director, Office of the Four Year Plan.
- Brendan Coyle as SS-Gruppenführer Heinrich Müller: Chief of RSHA Department IV (Gestapo).
- Ben Daniels as Dr Josef Bühler: State Secretary for the General Government of occupied Poland.
- Barnaby Kay as SS-Sturmbannführer Dr Rudolf Lange: Commander of the Sicherheitsdienst (SD) in Latvia.
- Owen Teale as Dr Roland Freisler: State Secretary, Reich Ministry of Justice.
- Peter Sullivan as SS-Oberführer Dr Karl Eberhard Schöngarth: SD officer assigned to the General Government.

Additional cast members include:

- Tom Hiddleston, in one of his first film roles, briefly appears in the beginning and end as a telephone operator.
- Ross O'Hennessy, appears in the beginning and middle as the SS Officer in charge of the Building.

== Production ==
=== Background ===
Colin Callendar, head of HBO NYC productions, identifies two primary historical arguments underpinning the narrative. He underscores the conference's role as a mechanism for consolidating Reinhard Heydrich's authority and that of the SS in executing the infamous "Final Solution." He also emphasizes the film's portrayal of a lack of a clearly defined and centralized policy preceding the Wannsee Conference. These insights reflect a functionalist interpretation of the Holocaust, highlighting the evolutionary and radicalizing nature of the genocide, often originating from lower ranks within the Nazi hierarchy. Callendar also notes the presence of distinct groups of various ranking officials (and their conflict objectives) which underscores the Holocaust's emergence as a result of competing interests among different governmental agencies.

In addition to Callendar, the producers had the input of three historians, including Michael Berenbaum of the United States Holocaust Museum and Andrea Axelrod as a historical advisor. Noted Holocaust historian Christopher Browning also acted as a consultant. Browning offered small critiques, including geographical mistakes, references to speeches and events that had not yet happened in January 1942 and how the German officials referred to each other. Axelrod provided extensive research and documentation (amounting to 170 citations), including verifying the amount of snowfall in Wannsee on the date of the conference.

=== Screenplay ===
Pierson brought Mandel into the project initially for an unproduced script entitled Complicity. This was intended to be a companion movie detailing the failure of the Allies to help with Jewish refugees. The piece never made it to the screen, most likely as a result of the sensitive subject of culpability of Western Allies.

Mandel used the only existing copy of the conference minutes, called the Wannsee Protocols, found in 1947 in the German Foreign Office files as the basis for the script. During an interview discussing a later adaptation of the screenplay into a theatre production, the author noted "I had never heard of the Wannsee Conference" and that Pierson told him "...it was the first thing he had encountered about the Holocaust that angered him rather than making him want to cry", he signed on to write the screenplay. The script is not verbatim from conversations at the conference and most of the actual dialogue is invented. The meeting occurred over a period of 90 minutes, which is the same running time of the movie.

=== Filming ===
Kenneth Branagh, the actor portraying Heydrich in the film, reported that he found the role deeply unsettling. Branagh's portrayal was challenging not only by the difficulty of delivering lines but also by the absence of discernible motivations or upbringing factors explaining Heydrich's chilling readiness to perpetrate genocide on an unprecedented scale. Branagh reaffirmed a recurring theme of the film, emphasizing its commitment to historical accuracy over sensationalism or star power, underscoring the importance of authentically recounting this harrowing chapter of history.

== Reception ==
=== Critical reception ===
Conspiracy has a 100% approval rating from 7 critic reviews on Rotten Tomatoes.

In The American Historical Review, Alan E. Steinweis critically analyzes the film, offering insights from a historian's perspective. Steinweis highlights instances within the film where certain scenes are identified as dramatic inventions, pointing out discrepancies between historical accuracy and cinematic portrayal. However, Steinweis underscores a common limitation in historians' critiques of films, noting their tendency to focus solely on specific fictionalized elements while overlooking broader thematic arguments and the overarching vision of the film.

Steinweis also juxtaposes Conspiracy with its 1984 German predecessor, Die Wannseekonferenz, suggesting that the earlier film may offer a more historically accurate depiction by providing a more detailed examination of the killing process. He critiques the portrayal of Reinhard Heydrich in Conspiracy while commending the depiction of Adolf Eichmann as "refreshing." Yet, Steinweis argues that a deeper analysis, often absent in historical reviews of films, would involve an exploration of the film's production history to uncover the filmmakers' intentions, historical arguments, and research methods underlying the film's creation.

James Rampton in The Independent praised the film,

"Showing as part of the BBC's commemoration of Holocaust Memorial Day, Frank Pierson's film underscores only too well the old maxim that evil prospers when good men do nothing."

— James Rampton

An impressed Austin Film Society had a lengthy review of the film and details about its production.

=== Awards and nominations ===
Year	Award	Category	Nominee(s)	Result	Ref.
2001	Artios Awards	Best Casting for Movie of the Week	Linda Lowy	Nominated	
2001	Online Film & Television Association Awards	Best Motion Picture Made for Television		Nominated	
2001	Online Film & Television Association Awards	Best Supporting Actor in a Motion Picture or Miniseries	Stanley Tucci	Nominated	
2001	Online Film & Television Association Awards	Best Editing in a Motion Picture or Miniseries		Nominated	
2001	Online Film & Television Association Awards	Best New Titles Sequence in a Motion Picture or Miniseries		Nominated	
2001	Peabody Awards		HBO Films produced in association with the BBC	Won	
2001	Primetime Emmy Awards	Outstanding Made for Television Movie	Frank Doelger, Frank Pierson, David M. Thompson, Peter Zinner, and Nick Gillott	Nominated	
2001	Primetime Emmy Awards	Outstanding Lead Actor in a Miniseries or a Movie	Kenneth Branagh	Won	
2001	Primetime Emmy Awards	Outstanding Supporting Actor in a Miniseries or a Movie	Colin Firth	Nominated	
2001	Primetime Emmy Awards	Outstanding Supporting Actor in a Miniseries or a Movie	Stanley Tucci	Nominated	
2001	Primetime Emmy Awards	Outstanding Directing for a Miniseries or a Movie	Frank Pierson	Nominated	
2001	Primetime Emmy Awards	Outstanding Writing for a Miniseries or a Movie	Loring Mandel	Won	
2001	Primetime Emmy Awards	Outstanding Cinematography for a Miniseries or a Movie	Stephen Goldblatt	Nominated	
2001	Primetime Emmy Awards	Outstanding Single-Camera Picture Editing for a Miniseries, Movie or a Special	Peter Zinner	Nominated	
2001	Primetime Emmy Awards	Outstanding Single-Camera Sound Mixing for a Miniseries or a Movie	Peter Glossop, John Hayward, Richard Pryke, and Kevin Tayler	Nominated	
2001	Primetime Emmy Awards	Outstanding Sound Editing for a Miniseries, Movie or a Special	Christopher Ackland, Gillian Dodders, Alan Paley, Felicity Cottrell, and Jason Swanscott	Nominated	
2002	American Film Institute Awards	TV Movie or Mini-Series or the Year		Nominated	
2002	American Film Institute Awards	Actor of the Year – Male – TV Movie or Mini-Series	Kenneth Branagh	Nominated	
2002	Directors Guild of America Awards	Outstanding Directorial Achievement in Movies for Television or Miniseries	Frank Pierson	Won	
2002	Golden Globe Awards	Best Miniseries or Motion Picture Made for Television		Nominated	
2002	Golden Globe Awards	Best Actor in a Miniseries or Motion Picture Made for Television	Kenneth Branagh	Nominated	
2002	Golden Globe Awards	Best Supporting Actor in a Series, Miniseries or Motion Picture Made for Television	Stanley Tucci	Won	
2002	Satellite Awards	Best Motion Picture Made for Television		Nominated	
2002	Satellite Awards	Best Actor in a Supporting Role in a Miniseries or a Motion Picture Made for Television	Colin Firth	Nominated	
2002	Satellite Awards	Best Actor in a Supporting Role in a Miniseries or a Motion Picture Made for Television	Stanley Tucci	Nominated	
2002	Writers Guild of America Awards	Long Form – Original	Loring Mandel	Won	
2003	British Academy Television Awards	Best Single Drama		Won	
2003	British Academy Television Awards	Best Actor	Kenneth Branagh	Nominated	

== See also ==
- The Wannsee Conference, a 1984 German TV film
- Die Wannseekonferenz, a German TV docudrama
- List of Holocaust films
- List of conspiracy thriller films
