= Josef Bühler =

German Nazi official (1904–1948)

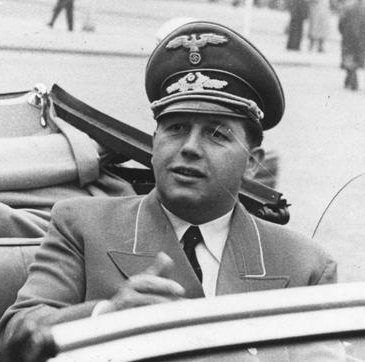
- Bühler in 1942
- Born: 16 February 1904; Bad Waldsee, Kingdom of Württemberg, German Empire
- Died: 22 August 1948 (aged 44); Montelupich Prison, Kraków, Polish People's Republic
- Status: Executed by hanging
- Conviction: Crimes against humanity
- Trial: Supreme National Tribunal
- Penalty: Death

State Secretary for General Government
- In office 8 March 1940 – 19 January 1945
- Governor General: Hans Frank
- Preceded by: Position created
- Succeeded by: Position abolished

Deputy Governor-General of the General Government of Occupied Poland
- In office 18 May 1940 – 19 January 1945
- Governor General: Hans Frank
- Preceded by: Arthur Seyss-Inquart
- Succeeded by: Position abolished

Personal details
- Party: Nazi Party
- Education: Ludwig-Maximilians-Universität München; Kiel University; Humboldt University of Berlin; University of Erlangen–Nuremberg
- Profession: Lawyer
- Known for: Wannsee Conference participant

Josef Bühler (16 February 1904 – 22 August 1948) was a German lawyer and convicted war criminal who, as the protégé of Governor General Hans Frank, rose to become his deputy as the State Secretary in the Nazi Germany-controlled General Government in Kraków during the Second World War. He participated in the January 1942 Wannsee Conference, at which the genocidal Final Solution to the Jewish Question was planned. He was convicted of crimes against peace, war crimes and crimes against humanity, and was executed.

== Early life and education ==
Bühler was born in Bad Waldsee into a Catholic family, the son of a baker. He attended boarding school and obtained his Abitur in 1922. He went on to study law at the Ludwig-Maximilians-Universität München, Kiel University, Humboldt University of Berlin and the University of Erlangen–Nuremberg. Bühler earned a Doctor of Law degree and passed the state law examination in 1930. That year, he joined the Munich law firm of Hans Frank, who regularly defended Adolf Hitler and the Nazi Party in court. From this point on, his professional life was closely linked with that of Frank. On 1 October 1932, he was made a probationary judge at the Munich district court.

== Career in Nazi Germany ==
Shortly after the Nazi seizure of power at the end of January 1933, Frank was appointed as the Minister of Justice for Bavaria on 10 March and Bühler became a member of his staff as a state attorney. He joined the Nazi Party on 1 April 1933 (membership number 1,663,751). He also was given a senior position in the National Socialist Association of German Legal Professionals. Bühler also joined Frank's Academy for German Law, was made a member of its presidium and contributed articles to the academy journal.

In October 1934, after the process of Gleichschaltung (coordination) transferred sovereignty from the states to the central government, Bühler moved from Bavaria to become a prosecutor in the Reich Ministry of Justice in Berlin. In 1935, he became the senior prosecutor at the Munich Oberlandesgericht (Higher Regional Court). After Frank was appointed as a minister without portfolio in Hitler's cabinet, he brought Bühler into his ministerial office as a Ministerialrat (Ministerial Counselor) in 1938. Unlike many other high-ranking Nazi officials, Bühler was never a member of the SA or the SS.

Just before the outbreak of the war, Bühler was conscripted into the German Army in August 1939 but Frank obtained his release within days. After the invasion of Poland by Nazi Germany in September 1939, Frank was appointed Governor General for the occupied Polish territories at the end of October and Bühler accompanied him to Kraków. On 8 December, he was made head of the Governor General's office with the rank of Ministerialdirektor and, on 8 March 1940, he advanced to the position of State Secretary. After Arthur Seyss-Inquart, Frank's Deputy Governor General, departed to become the Reichskommissar of the occupied Netherlands in May 1940, Bühler functioned as Frank's deputy, a designation that was made permanent in June 1941. Though not given the formal title of Deputy Governor General, as State Secretary he was Frank's chief deputy and represented him during his absences.

=== Wannsee Conference and the Final Solution ===
The meeting minutes of the Wannsee Conference identifying "Staatssekretär Dr. Bühler" as a participant.

Bühler attended the Wannsee Conference on 20 January 1942 as the representative of the Governor General's office. This conference was called to discuss the implementation of the Final Solution of the Jewish Question. The minutes of the meeting document Bühler stating that the General Government would welcome the launch of the Final Solution in its territory, and he stressed the importance of solving "the Jewish Question in the General Government as quickly as possible". He also stated that "of the two-and-a-half million Jews concerned, the majority are unfit for work". When his fellow conference participant Adolf Eichmann was asked at his 1961 trial in Israel what was meant by this statement, he answered that Bühler had wanted to intimate "that they should be killed".

== Arrest, trial and execution ==
Bühler fled from Kraków back to Germany on 18 January 1945, the day before the Red Army entered the city. He was arrested in Schrobenhausen on 30 May 1945 by American forces and interned in Nuremberg. He testified in Frank's defense at the Nuremberg Trials on 23 April 1946, denying all knowledge of the Holocaust and trying to deflect all blame onto the SS, in particular, Reichsführer-SS Heinrich Himmler and SS-Obergruppenführer Friedrich-Wilhelm Krüger, the Higher SS and Police Leader for the General Government.

Shortly afterward, on 25 May 1946, in accordance with the Moscow Declarations that established the principle that war criminals were to be transferred for trial to the nations where their crimes took place, Bühler was extradited to the Polish People's Republic. His trial opened before the Supreme National Tribunal on 17 June 1948. Bühler was found guilty on 10 July of crimes against peace, war crimes, and crimes against humanity. He was sentenced to death and ordered to forfeit all of his property. Clemency pleas were filed by Bühler, his attorney, his wife and Cardinal Michael von Faulhaber of Munich. All were rejected by Polish President Bolesław Bierut, and Bühler was executed by hanging on 22 August 1948 at Montelupich Prison in Kraków.

== Portrayals in popular media ==
Bühler's death is the inciting incident in the 1992 alternate history novel Fatherland by Robert Harris. The novel postulates a long war between Nazi Germany and the Soviet Union, and a cold war with the United States. The novel's protagonist investigates Bühler's murder in 1964, which is part of a Gestapo effort to conceal the (by then completed) Final Solution.

Bühler was portrayed by Reinhard Glemnitz in the German film Die Wannseekonferenz (1984), by Ben Daniels in the BBC/HBO film Conspiracy (2001) and by Sascha Nathan in the German film Die Wannseekonferenz (2022).

== See also ==
- General Government administration

== Sources ==
- Dr. Josef Bühler (1904–1948) in the Wanssee Conference House Memorial and Educational Institute
- Klee, Ernst (2007). Das Personenlexikon zum Dritten Reich. Wer war was vor und nach 1945. Frankfurt-am-Main: Fischer-Taschenbuch-Verlag. ISBN 978-3-596-16048-8.
- Loose, Ingo (2017). "Josef Bühler: State Secretary for the General Government. A Behind-the-Scenes Perpetrator". In Jasch, Hans-Christian; Kreutzmüller, Christoph (eds.). The Participants: The Men of the Wannsee Conference. Berghahn Books. ISBN 978-1-785-33671-3.
- Loose, Ingo (2025): Bühler, Josef, Jurist, Staatssekretär und Stellvertreter des Generalgouverneurs für die besetzten polnischen Gebiete (1939–1945). In: Baden-Württembergische Biographien, Bd. IX. Im Auftrag der Kommission für geschichtliche Landeskunde in Baden-Württemberg herausgegeben von Martin Furtwängler. Ostfildern: Jan Thorbecke, ISBN 978-3799596060, pp. 48–51.
- Transcript of Bühler's testimony, 23 April 1946, Nuremberg Trial Proceedings Vol. 12, pp.64–113
- Trial of Dr. Joseph Bühler, Staatssekretär and Deputy Governor-General, Law Report, United Nations War Crimes Commission, 1949
