= Erich Neumann (politician) =

German Nazi Party civil servant and SS-Oberführer (1892–1951)

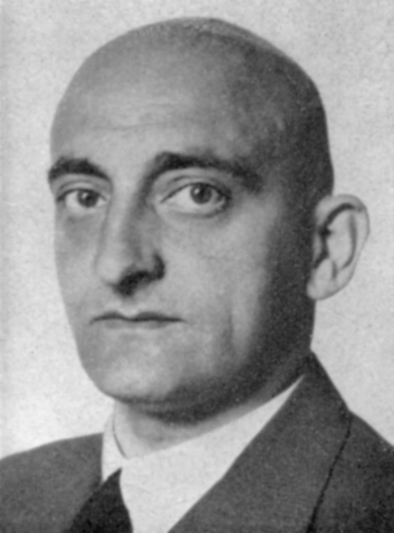

State Secretary Four Year Plan
- In office 23 July 1938 – 1 August 1942

Ministerial Director Four Year Plan
- In office 23 October 1936 – 23 July 1938

Ministerial Director Prussian State Ministry
- In office 11 February 1933 – 23 October 1936

Additional positions
- 1933–1942: Prussian State Councilor
- 1932–1934: Deputy Plenipotentiary; Reichsrat

Personal details
- Born: Adolf Walter Erich Neumann; 31 May 1892 Forst, Province of Brandenburg, Kingdom of Prussia, German Empire
- Died: 23 March 1951 (aged 58) Garmisch-Partenkirchen, Bavaria, West Germany
- Party: Nazi Party
- Other political affiliations: German National People's Party
- Education: University of Freiburg; University of Leipzig; University of Halle-Wittenberg
- Occupation: Civil servant
- Profession: Lawyer

Military service
- Allegiance: German Empire; Nazi Germany
- Branch/service: Imperial German Army; Heer; Schutzstaffel (SS)
- Years of service: 1914–1917; 1935–1937; 1934–1945
- Rank: Leutnant der Reserves; Rittmeister der Reserves; SS-Oberführer
- Unit: Mounted Light Infantry Regiment 2 Reiter Regiment 9
- Battles/wars: World War I
- Awards: Iron Cross, second class Wound Badge

Erich Neumann (31 May 1892 – 23 March 1951) was a German lawyer and civil servant, a member of the Nazi party and an SS-Oberführer. Neumann was a participant in the Wannsee Conference that determined the implementation of the Final Solution. He was interned at the end of the Second World War but was released in 1948 due to ill health and was never prosecuted.

== Early life, education and war service ==
Neumann was born into a Protestant family in Forst (Lausitz) where his father was a factory owner. He attended the local Volksschule and a boarding secondary school. After receiving his Abitur in 1911, Neumann enrolled at the University of Freiburg to study law and economics where he also joined the Corps Rhenania Freiburg fraternity. He continued his studies at the University of Leipzig and the University of Halle-Wittenberg. After passing his first state law examination in August 1914, he joined the Imperial German Army after the outbreak of the First World War. He served in the 2nd Mounted Light Infantry Regiment (Jäger-Regiment zu Pferde Nr. 2) on the eastern front before being discharged on 30 October 1917 due to a severe hand wound. He left the service with the rank of Leutnant of reserves, having earned the Iron Cross, second class, and the Wound Badge.

== Employment in the Prussian civil service ==
Neumann began a legal clerkship in January 1918 with the Prussian state judicial administration in Stettin (today, Szczecin). After passing his second state legal examination in October 1920, he entered the civil service as a government attorney (Regierungsassessor) in the Prussian Ministry of the Interior and, thereafter, in its Essen district office. He became a Government Councilor (Regierungsrat) in October 1923, and transferred to the Prussian Ministry of Trade and Commerce in December. From November 1926 through September 1928, he served as the District Administrator (Landrat) in Freystadt (Lower Silesia). On 1 October 1928, he returned to the Prussian Ministry of Trade and Commerce as a Ministerial Councilor (Ministerialrat). There he headed the department for reparations, subsidies and credits, and served as the German representative at an international debt conference in Paris in 1931-32. Following the 1932 Prussian coup d'état by the administration of Reich Chancellor Franz von Papen, Neumann was transferred to the Prussian State Ministry in September 1932, where he was placed in charge of administrative reforms.

== Career in Nazi Germany ==
=== Government posts ===
Shortly after Adolf Hitler's seizure of power, Neumann was promoted to the post of Permanent Secretary (Ministerialdirektor) on 11 February 1933 and was made a deputy plenipotentiary to the Reichsrat for Prussia, where he served until its abolition on 14 February 1934. Formerly a member of the German National People's Party, Neumann joined the Nazi Party in May 1933 (membership number 2,645,024). On 15 September of that year, he was appointed to the Prussian State Council by Prussian Minister President Hermann Göring and served as its secretary until 1942. In October 1933, he became a founding member of Hans Frank's Academy for German Law, serving on its committees for administrative law and municipal constitutions. In the summers of 1935 through 1937, he participated in military training exercises with the Reiter Regiment 9, headquartered in Fürstenwalde, and later advanced to the rank of Rittmeister of reserves.

On 23 October 1936, Neumann was appointed the director of the Foreign Currency Department of the Office of the Plenipotentiary for the Four Year Plan, headed by Göring. On 23 July 1938, Neumann was promoted to State Secretary and Deputy to Paul Körner, Göring's chief deputy in the Four Year Plan, and sat as a member of its general council (Generalrats). Neumann attended Göring's 12 November 1938 meeting about the "Aryanisation" of the German economy. After the occupation of Czechoslovakia in March 1939, Neumann was involved in the actions that resulted in the takeover of the Petschek coal concern by the Reichswerke Hermann Göring conglomerate. He also profited personally from the Aryanization process, as he lived in a villa near the Berlin Botanical Garden that a Jewish woman had been forced to sell in order to emigrate.

After the German invasion of the Soviet Union, Neumann became a member of the Economic Management Plan East (Wirtschaftsorganisation Ost) in 1941 and 1942 that planned for the economic exploitation of the Soviet Union. From 1941, he was the deputy chairman of the supervisory board of Kontinentale Öl, a company set up for the exploitation of Soviet oil reserves.

As State Secretary, Neumann was the official representative of the Four Year Plan at the 20 January 1942 Wannsee Conference, at which the genocidal Final Solution to the Jewish Question was planned. Neumann requested that Jewish workers in firms essential to the war effort not be deported for the time being. His objection was not that they should be spared based on humanitarian or moral grounds, only that they not be deported before replacements could be found, thus temporarily retaining them for their economic benefit to the Reich. On 1 August 1942, Neumann left government service at his own request to become the General Director of the German Potassium Syndicate (Deutsches Kalisyndikat) where he remained through the fall of the Nazi regime in May 1945.

=== SS membership ===
In addition to his government positions, Neumann was also a member of the Allgemeine SS. He joined the organization on 13 August 1934 (SS number 222,014) where he first was assigned to the SS-Oberabschnitt Ost (SS-Main District East) (1934) then to the office of the Reichsführer-SS (1934–36), the SS Main Office (1936–39) and, finally, back to Heinrich Himmler's personal staff (1939–45). Commissioned as an SS-Sturmbannführer in August 1934, he rose through the ranks and attained his final promotion to SS-Oberführer on 30 January 1939.

SS ranks
Date	Rank
13 August 1934	SS-Sturmbannführer
13 September 1936	SS-Obersturmbannführer
30 January 1938	SS-Standartenführer
30 January 1939	SS-Oberführer

== Post-war life ==
After Germany's surrender, Neumann was interned by the Allies, first in Ludwigsburg and later in Nuremberg. He was repeatedly interrogated but denied all knowledge of the Holocaust, even refusing to admit that he had been an attendee at the meeting in Wanssee. No charges were ever brought against him and he was released due to poor health in mid-1948. He returned to his family in Grainau and was employed as an advisor to the Potassium Syndicate. He died three years later of acute circulatory failure in Garmisch-Partenkirchen, on 23 March 1951.

== Film portrayals ==
Neumann was portrayed by Dieter Groest in the German film Die Wannseekonferenz (1984), by Jonathan Coy in the BBC/HBO film Conspiracy (2001) and by Matthias Bundschuh in the German film Die Wannseekonferenz (2022).

== Sources ==
- Erich Neumann Biography in the Wanssee Conference House Memorial and Educational Institute
- Erich Neumann Biography in the Files of the Reich Chancellery, Weimar Republic
- Kreutzmüller, Christoph (2017). "Erich Neumann: Plenipotentiary for the Four Year Plan. A Colorless, Compliant Prussian". In Jasch, Hans-Christian; Kreutzmüller, Christoph (eds.). The Participants: The Men of the Wannsee Conference. Berghahn Books. ISBN 978-1-785-33671-3.
- Lilla, Joachim (2005). Der Preußische Staatsrat 1921–1933: Ein biographisches Handbuch. Düsseldorf: Droste Verlag. ISBN 978-3-770-05271-4.
- Schiffer Publishing Ltd., ed. (2000). SS Officers List: SS-Standartenführer to SS-Oberstgruppenführer (As of 30 January 1942). Schiffer Military History Publishing. ISBN 0-7643-1061-5.
