= Roger Moorhouse =

British historian (born 1968)

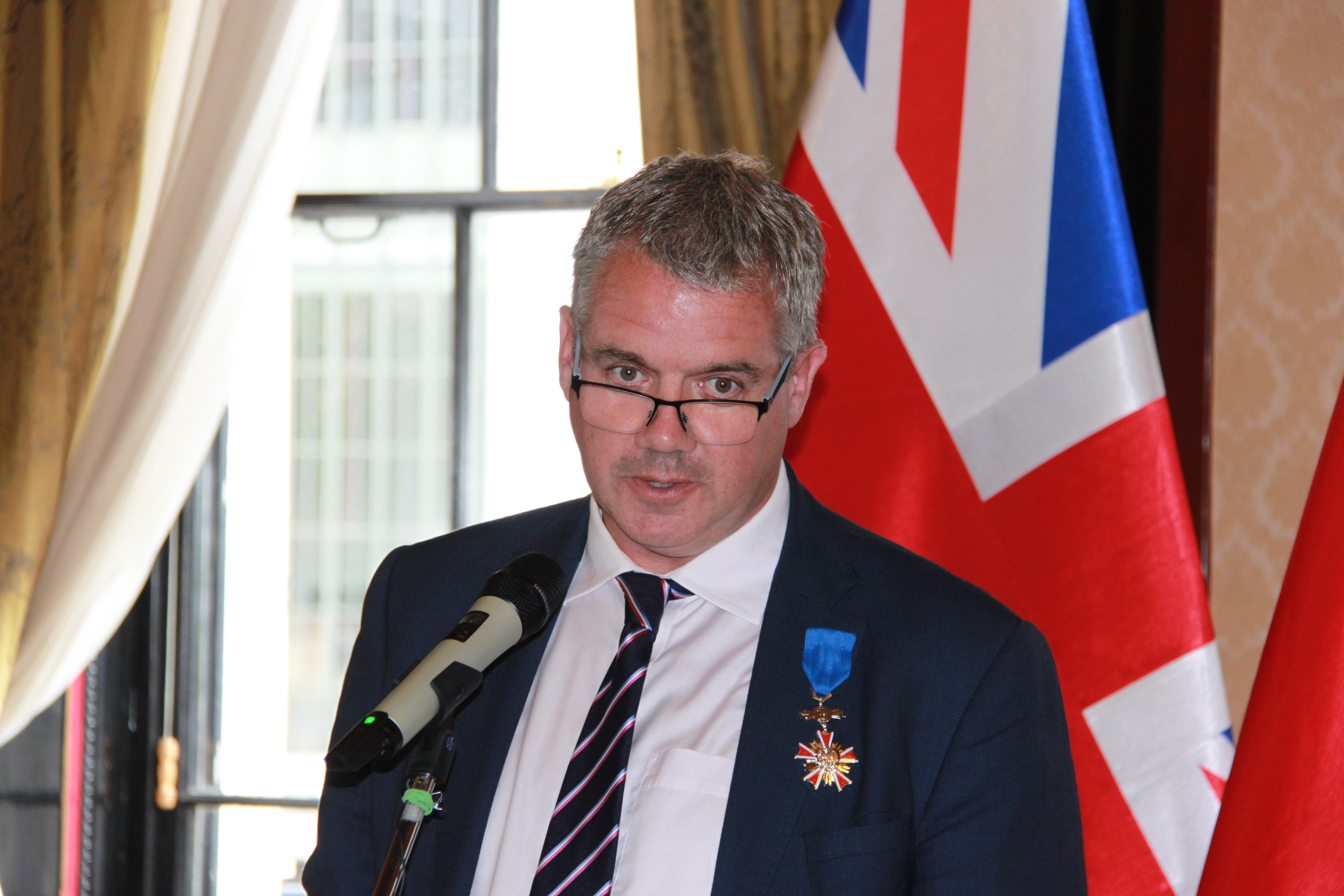
- Moorhouse in 2020
- Born: 1967 (age 58–59); Stockport, Cheshire, England
- Education: University of London
- Occupations: Historian; author
- Spouse: Melissa Smellie (m. 1995)
- Children: 2
- Writing career
- Subject: European history

Roger Moorhouse (born 1968) is a British historian and author.

== Education ==
He was born in Stockport, Cheshire, England, and attended Berkhamsted School and the School of Slavonic and East European Studies of the University of London, graduating with an MA in history and politics in 1994.

Whilst a student, Moorhouse worked as a researcher for Professor Norman Davies, collaborating on many of the latter's best-known publications, including Europe: A History, The Isles: A History and Rising '44 and culminating in the publication in 2002 of a co-authored study of the history of the city of Wrocław (the former German Breslau) entitled Microcosm: Portrait of a Central European City.

== Main publications ==
- Killing Hitler (2006) on the numerous attempts and plots on Hitler's life.(Bantam Books, ISBN 0553803697)
- Berlin at War: Life and Death in Hitler's Capital, 1939–45 (2010) - a social history of Berlin during World War II. (Basic Books, ISBN 978-0465005338)
- The Devils' Alliance: Hitler's Pact with Stalin, 1939–1941 (2014) - on the Molotov–Ribbentrop Pact and the strategic relationship between Nazi Germany and the Soviet Union that resulted from it. (Bodley Head, ISBN 978-1847922052)
- The Third Reich in 100 Objects (2017) (Greenhill, ISBN 978-1784381806)
- First to Fight: The Polish War 1939 (2019 in the UK, 2020 in the US, as Poland 1939) (Bodley Head, ISBN 1847924603)
- The Forgers: The Forgotten Story of the Holocaust's Most Audacious Rescue Operation (2023) - the story of the Ładoś Group (Bodley Head, ISBN 1847926770)

== Summary ==
A fluent German speaker, Moorhouse is a specialist in modern German history, particularly on Adolf Hitler and the Third Reich. In this capacity, he has written for The Times, The Independent on Sunday, and the Financial Times, and is a regular contributor to both the BBC History magazine and History Today. Increasingly, Moorhouse is concerning himself with modern Polish history, especially of the wartime period.

Moorhouse is a regular public speaker, and has appeared, among others, at the Edinburgh International Book Festival and the Bath Literature Festival. Since 2016, he has been a visiting professor at the College of Europe in Natolin near Warsaw. He is a fellow of the Royal Historical Society.

== Other publications ==
- Jak powstało Powstanie '44, Norman Davies, (Znak, Kraków, 2005), Chapter
- The Men Who Tried to Kill Hitler, Roger Manvell & Heinrich Fraenkel, (Frontline Books, 2008), Introduction
- He Was My Chief: The Memoirs of Adolf Hitler's Secretary, Christa Schroeder, (Frontline Books, 2009), Introduction
- With Hitler to the End: The Memoir of Hitler's Valet, Heinz Linge, (Frontline Books, 2009), Introduction
- I was Hitler's Chauffeur: The Memoirs of Erich Kempka, Erich Kempka, (Frontline Books, 2010), Introduction
- The Hitler I Knew, Otto Dietrich, (Skyhorse Publishing, 2010), Introduction
- While Berlin Burns, Hans-Georg von Studnitz, (Pen & Sword Books, 2012), Introduction
- The Sniper Anthology, Martin Pegler (Ed.), (Frontline Books, 2012), Chapter on Simo Häyhä
- Hitler was My Friend: The Memoirs of Hitler's Photographer, Heinrich Hoffmann, (Frontline Books, 2012), Introduction
- The Last Witness, Rochus Misch, (Frontline Books, 2014), Introduction
- Ship of Fate: The Story of the MV Wilhelm Gustloff (2016)

== Awards and honours ==
- Shortlisted for the Hessell-Tiltman Prize for history for Berlin at War (2010).
- Shortlisted for the Duke of Wellington Medal for Military History 2020 for First to Fight (2019).
- Shortlisted for the British Army Military Book of the Year 2020 for First to Fight (2019).
- Awarded the Knight's Cross of the Order of Merit of the Republic of Poland (2020).
- Winner of the Polish Foreign Ministry History Prize for First to Fight (2019).

== Personal life ==
Moorhouse is married with two children and lives in Tring, Hertfordshire.
