= Paul Krannhals =

German philosopher

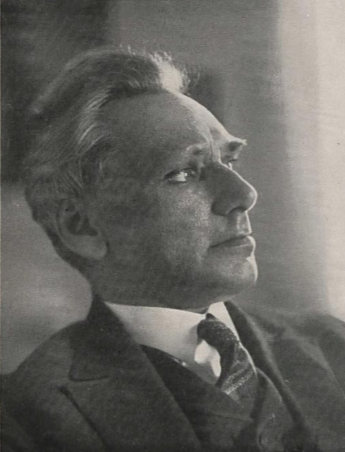
Paul Krannhals in Munich

Paul Krannhals (born 14 November 1883 in Riga; died 16 August 1934 in Munich) was a Baltic-German philosopher. He was an early supporter of the NSDAP in the 1920s and 1930s. His work Das Organische Weltbild was referred to by Otto Dietrich as "the first attempt from a National Socialist perspective...to scientifically clarify and present the organic or universalist worldview".

== Life ==
Born on 14 November 1883 in Riga, Paul von Krannhals, a chemist by training, took part in the First World War and was for some time a prisoner in Russia. It was during this time that he worked on developing his philosophical views. After his return, he taught privately. He also worked as a newspaper editor in Dessau and Essen from 1920 to 1925. In 1929 Krannhals co-founded Alfred Rosenberg's Kampfbund für deutsche Kultur. He joined the NSDAP and the National Socialist German Student Union and in 1931 became head of an NSDStB working group "Das organische Weltbild". In 1933 and 1934 he was a lecturer in the Nazi Teachers' Association. In 1934 he was co-editor of the völkisch magazine Die Sonne. Krannhals was a follower of Jakob Wilhelm Hauer's German Faith Movement. He died on 18 August 1934 in Dresden. After the end of the Second World War, several of Krannhals' writings were placed on the list of literature to be discarded in the Soviet Occupation Zone and in the German Democratic Republic.

== Work ==
Krannhals' work was an attempt to transpose the organicism implicit in the chemical and biological sciences into the historical, political and religious spheres. Krannhals' magnum opus is Das Organische Weltbild (The Organic Worldview). In a lecture at Cologne University in 1934, Otto Dietrich described this work as "the first, seen from the national socialist point of view, correct attempt to scientifically clarify and illustrate the organic or universalistic worldview as in accordance with the interior of our German way of life." A large two-volume work, it is a protest against what Krannhals saw as the mechanisation of the world and the influence of mechanistic ideologies in the humanities. Krannhals called for "respect for life" in all fields. In political science and economics, individualism has given rise to the absurdity of the struggle of all against all, camouflaged behind the ideology of the contract, which transforms the state into a "Zweckverband", an association of interests. Any legal order based on contractualism serves only the material well-being of a certain category of the population. The state organised according to the principles of contractualism does not generate any ethics of its own, does not arouse in its citizens any sense of duty, virtues that are only possible if one accepts the existence of a totality (Ganzheit) superior to individuals. The absence of ethics leads to an existence devoid of meaning and value. Mechanistic rationalism fractures and mutilates the unity of life. Mechanisation is synonymous with petrification.

Referring to the work of Ferdinand Tönnies, who made the distinction between Kürwille (arbitrary will) and Wesenswille (essential will), Krannhals claims that the combination of individualism and contract ideology has destroyed communities (Gemeinschaft) to make way for society (Gesellschaft). In this process, it is a destructive, warlike male principle that dissolves and separates the constituent elements of communities, in opposition to a creative, constructive female principle. Political personalities are the product of a harmonious fusion between these two principles. Taking up the dichotomies of vitalist/organicist thinking, which is characteristic of a certain conservative ideology, Krannhals contrasts culture, community, feeling, the intuitive Wesenschau (the intuitive view of essence or essences) and racial consciousness (Artbewußtsein) with mechanistic/technicist civilisation on the one hand, to society and the successive ephemeral fashions it produces, in which form temporarily imposes itself as an obligatory rule of behaviour without having any qualitative and lasting ethical content.

Krannhals defines the essence of the organicist political conception, for which the organic state is the radical opposite of the unimaginative and bureaucratic state, which is a purely formal construction and the result of a soulless logic. The organic state is also opposed to the absolutist state, which deliberately confuses the leadership of the state (in this case the sovereign) with the state (Louis XIV: l'Etat, c'est moi!). Krannhals, in making this statement of principle, returns to Immanuel Kant, whose late work shows a clear desire to go beyond the conception of the state that rests on the individual alone and aims only at his 'little happiness'. Kant, Krannhals argues, wanted to anchor the rule of law in the idea of ethical freedom, justice and ethics being inseparable here. The idea of an organic state is precisely what the ethical conscience postulates. It asks the people, the soul of the state, to follow freely, without constraints and by eliminating the artificial constraints they might have to face, the laws of life, which are embodied in the natural vital forms.

The organicist path inaugurated by Kant continues in Johann Gottlieb Fichte and Hegel, Krannhals claims, despite the dialectical method. It continues in the work of the school of historical law (Savigny, von Eichhorn) and in theorists who intend to 'biologise' political theories, such as the Swedish geopolitician and political scientist Rudolf Kjellén or the French philosopher Gustave Le Bon. Krannhals refers more explicitly to H.G. Holle, for whom the Volk is primordial and the state secondary, a mere organised and organising form of the people. The definition of the Volk given by Krannhals and Holle, which is based on a racial approach, does not exclude mixed peoples.

Where there is racial mixing, a people can remain as long as the original homogeneous core -the völkischer Grundstock- continues to determine the culture. The ethical consciousness of a people is nothing other than the full acceptance and development of its own intimate consciousness of itself as a natural phenomenon. In view of these organicist/biologising definitions, Krannhals concludes that the aim of any genuine legal order is to protect the biological necessities of the communal life of the people. Organic politics must prevent interest groups from dominating the state. Liberalism does not ensure freedom in the ethical sense. Krannhals opposes Marxism to "true socialism" in the line of Sombart. The task of the state and of "true socialism" is to organise and federate social differences and not to perpetuate their antagonisms in sterile (because purely discursive) parliamentary games.

In his chapter defining the organic economy, Krannhals summarises all the major orientations of the organicist school of economists, a mixture of Fichtean autarky, pulpit socialism and conservative corporatism. Through a didactic dichotomy in which the polemical will is not absent, Krannhals opposes money (Geld) to blood (Blut), that is to say a quantitative principle (which transforms everything qualitative into quantitative) to a qualitative principle (which transforms everything quantitative into qualitative). The aim of the organic economy is to achieve the domination of blood over money, of personality over things. Science has collapsed and is floundering because it has isolated itself from experience. It can only progress by revaluing its instinctive dimensions. Experience is an inexhaustible source in the process of forming concepts. Knowledge must be organised on the basis of local experience, the national experience of the people. Art and religion must also follow organic paths if they are to escape the sterilisation caused by the domination of mechanistic ideologies.

== Writings ==
- Das organische Weltbild. Grundlagen einer neuentstehenden deutschen Kultur, München 1928.
- Der Weltsinn der Technik als Schlüssel zu ihrer Kulturbedeutung, München/Berlin 1932.
- Religion als Sinnerfüllung des Lebens, Leipzig 1933.
- Der Glaubensweg des deutschen Menschen, Eisenach 1934.
- Revolution des Geistes, Leipzig 1935 (2. Auflage 1937).
