= Leopold Gutterer =

German Nazi Party official (1902–1996)

State Secretary Reich Ministry of Public Enlightenment and Propaganda
- In office 23 May 1941 – 22 April 1944
- Minister: Joseph Goebbels
- Preceded by: Karl Hanke
- Succeeded by: Werner Naumann

Vice President Reich Chamber of Culture
- In office 23 May 1941 – 22 April 1944
- President: Joseph Goebbels
- Preceded by: Karl Hanke
- Succeeded by: Werner Naumann

Head of Department II (Propaganda) Reich Ministry of Public Enlightenment and Propaganda
- In office March 1938 – 23 May 1941

Personal details
- Born: 25 April 1902 Baden-Baden, Grand Duchy of Baden, German Empire
- Died: 27 December 1996 (aged 94) Aachen, North Rhine-Westphalia, Germany
- Party: Nazi Party
- Education: Goethe University Frankfurt
- Occupation: Newspaper editor
- Awards: Golden Party Badge

Military service
- Allegiance: Nazi Germany
- Branch/service: Schutzstaffel (SS); German Army
- Years of service: 1927–1945; 1944–1945
- Rank: SS-Brigadeführer; Unteroffizier
- Battles/wars: World War II

Leopold Gutterer (25 April 1902 – 27 December 1996) was a Nazi Party official and propagandist. He rose to the positions of State Secretary in the Reich Ministry for Public Enlightenment and Propaganda and Vice President of the Reich Chamber of Culture in Nazi Germany. In both offices, he reported directly to Reichsminister of Propaganda Joseph Goebbels. He was also an SS-Brigadeführer. After the conclusion of the Second World War, he underwent denazification and was sentenced to serve time in a labor camp.

== Early life ==
Gutterer was born in Baden-Baden and, after graduating from the local Gymnasium in 1920, he served in the Freikorps as a member of the Marinebrigade Ehrhardt. He also was a member of the Deutschvölkischer Schutz- und Trutzbund, the largest and most active antisemitic organization in the Weimar Republic. He worked for a time as a newspaper editor in 1922 before enrolling in courses on German studies, theater and ethnology at the Goethe University Frankfurt, though it is unclear whether he earned a university degree.

On 23 May 1925, Gutterer joined the Nazi Party (membership number 6,275) and, as an early Party member, he would later be awarded the Golden Party Badge. He co-founded a Nazi newspaper, the Frankfurter Beobachter (Frankfurt Observer) in Frankfurt am Main and worked as an editor and publisher from 1927. That same year, he also joined the SS in Frankfurt (SS number 1,028).

Gutterer next served as the Nazi Party Bezirksleiter in Göttingen, and was made the editor of the Niedersachsen Beobachter (Lower Saxony Observer), working full-time for the Party from 1929. A persuasive orator, he was named a national Party speaker (Reichsreder) and delivered propaganda addresses at party events throughout Germany. Because of this, he was arrested several times and served several short jail sentences. He served successively from 1931 as an Ortsgruppenleiter, Bezirksleiter and Kreisleiter in Hanover before becoming the propaganda leader of Gau Southern Hanover-Brunswick. He had a leading role in coordinating election rallies for Adolf Hitler in the successful Nazi campaign for the 1933 Lippe state election.

== Career in Nazi Germany ==
After the Nazi seizure of power, Gutterer was appointed to a government post with the rank of Regierungsrat (government councilor) on 1 April 1933 in the recently established Reich Ministry for Propaganda. There he worked in Department II (Propaganda) where the planning and execution of all large-scale propaganda campaigns took place. Gutterer headed the desk that was responsible for all mass rallies. He was also in charge of coordinating the Ministry's participation in the Winterhilfswerk annual winter donation drive. In addition to staging the May Day celebrations in Berlin and the Nuremberg rallies, he was in charge of the planning and designing of the annual Reich Harvest Thanksgiving Festivals that were held from 1933 to 1937 at the Bückeberg Hill.

On 1 January 1935, Gutterer was promoted to Oberregierungsrat (senior government councilor). After serving as deputy department head, and being promoted to Ministerialrat (ministerial councilor) in April 1937, he took over as head of Department II in March 1938. His next promotion took place 20 April 1938, directly to the rank of Ministerial Director, skipping the intermediate rank of Ministerialdirigent. In August 1940, all of the ministry's specialist departments, with the exception of two press departments under Otto Dietrich, were subordinated to Gutterer. State Secretary Karl Hanke, the highest ranking civil servant in the Ministry, had fallen out of favor with Goebbels because of his romantic involvement with the Reichminister's wife Magda, and he had been on leave since August 1939. On 23 May 1941, Gutterer was officially named to succeed Hanke as State Secretary. He also concurrently held the post of Vice President of the Reich Chamber of Culture. Goebbels wrote of Gutterer in his diary that day: "He will certainly always be a loyal follower to me."

Gutterer was involved in the persecution of Germany's Jews. On 15 August 1941, he chaired a meeting with some forty officials from other ministries and agencies to discuss the issue of forcing German Jews to wear a special visible identification marking, known as the yellow badge. This was already being done in occupied Poland. Gutterer justified this on the grounds that the marking of Jews was a matter vital to the morale of the German war effort. Gutterer proposed numerous measures of intensified restriction and persecution, the precondition for the enforcement of which was the identification of Jews. He noted that only 19,000 of the 70,000 Jews in Berlin were working. The rest, he said, should be "carted off to Russia … best of all actually would be to kill them." Goebbels took the proposal to Hitler and, on 19 August, obtained his consent to move forward with the identification procedure. A police regulation was signed on 1 September, published on 5 September and went into force on 19 September 1941.

Gutterer was invited by SS-Obergruppenführer Reinhard Heydrich to represent the Propaganda Ministry at the Wannsee Conference, the meeting called to coordinate the implementation of the Final Solution. Originally scheduled for 9 December 1941, it was postponed to 20 January 1942, and Gutterer was unable to attend due to a scheduling conflict, but he expressed an interest in attending any follow-up meetings. On 8 May 1942, Gutterer delivered a speech opening The Soviet Paradise, an anti-Soviet propaganda exhibition in Berlin's Lustgarten that was visited by over 1.3 million people over the following month.

Goebbels had been dissatisfied with Gutterer's performance for some time and, on 22 April 1944, he was replaced as State Secretary by Werner Naumann. Gutterer was compensated by being appointed a managing director of UFA, the mammoth Nazi film production company, at "a huge salary". Later that year, he was called up for service in the Wehrmacht. Though holding the rank of SS-Brigadeführer since 9 November 1940, he was deployed at the front lines as a non-commissioned officer in an anti-tank gun unit during the final phase of the Second World War until he was taken prisoner by the American forces.

== Post-war life ==
After being released, Gutterer initially lived incognito as a farmhand in the village of Motten in the Rhön Mountains of Bavaria until October 1947, before he was identified, interned at a camp in Hammelburg and tried in the German denazification process. Classified as a Group II "offender", he was sentenced to five years in a labor camp. However, in a hearing before the Nuremberg Appeals Chamber on 14 December 1948, this verdict was reduced to one year in a labor camp, lifelong deprivation of pension, surrender of 80 percent of personal assets and an eight-year professional ban. From 1955 to about 1962, he was the managing director of a news cinema in Düsseldorf. In the mid-1960s, he worked as the director of the Theater Aachen. In 1985, Gutterer was one of the few contemporary Nazi officials that were interviewed by the American historian Nathan Stoltzfus, during his research into the Rosenstrasse protest against the deportation of Berlin's Jews. Gutterer died in December 1996 in Aachen.

== Sources ==
- Browning, Christopher R. (2004). The Origins of the Final Solution: The Evolution of Nazi Jewish Policy, September 1939–March 1932. University of Nebraska Press. ISBN 978-0-803-21327-2.
- Klee, Ernst (2007). Das Personenlexikon zum Dritten Reich. Wer war was vor und nach 1945. Frankfurt-am-Main: Fischer-Taschenbuch-Verlag. ISBN 978-3-596-16048-8.
- Longerich, Peter (2015). Goebbels: A Biography. Vintage. ISBN 978-0-099-52369-7.
- Roseman, Mark (2002). The Wannsee Conference and the Final Solution: A Reconsideration. New York: Picador. ISBN 978-0-312-42234-9.
- Schiffer Publishing Ltd., ed. (2000). SS Officers List: SS-Standartenführer to SS-Oberstgruppenführer (As of 30 January 1942). Schiffer Military History Publishing. ISBN 0-7643-1061-5.
- Stoltzfus, Nathan (2001). Resistance of the Heart: Intermarriage and the Rosenstrasse Protest in Nazi Germany. Rutgers University Press. ISBN 978-0-813-52909-7.
