= Microcosm: Portrait of a Central European City =

2002 book by Norman Davies and Roger Moorhouse

- Book cover
- Author: Norman Davies, Roger Moorhouse
- Translator: Andrzej Pawelec
- Language: English
- Subject: History
- Publisher: Jonathan Cape
- Publication date: 2002
- Media type: Print (Hardback)
- Pages: 384 pp.
- ISBN: 978-0224062435

Microcosm: Portrait of a Central European City is a 2002 book by British historians Norman Davies and Roger Moorhouse about the history of Wrocław, the largest city in western Poland.

== Content ==
The book opens with a description of the siege and fall of German Breslau at the very end of the Second World War. The attacking Red Army reduces many streets of the city to rubble, the remaining Germans gradually withdraw. The hopeless situation of the civilians, complicated by shelling, temperatures of minus 20 and food shortages, deteriorates still further as revenge-seeking Soviet military leaders allow mass murder, rape and looting.

The opening chapter of the book contains a description of the prehistoric island settlement in the Oder whose inhabitants took part in the amber and salt trade. The next chapters, named Wrotizla, Vretslav, Presslaw, Breslau and Wroclaw, give exhaustive accounts of the ensuing periods. The authors show the impact of natural phenomena and events such as pandemics, pogroms, attack by the Mongols, the Hussite Wars, the struggles of the Reformation, the Thirty Years' War, Prussian expansionism, the Napoleonic Wars, Nazism and Stalinism.

The main premise of the book is to present the history of Wrocław as a microcosm of the history of central Europe as a whole. To this end, it is suggested that the city bears a complex of historical hallmarks that could be interpreted as being particular to the historical experience of that region. These hallmarks include multi-national settlement, the presence of a Jewish community, the development of dynastic rather than national polities in the pre-modern era and the exposure in the 20th century to both Nazism and Soviet Communism.

== Reception ==
Microcosm was well received by the reading public upon its release. Apart from the original English the book was also published in the Polish, German, Czech and Italian languages.

The majority of reviewers were very positive about the book. Writing in the "English Historical Review", Richard Butterwick wrote that: "Davies and Moorhouse set out to present the history of the city, a microcosm of Central Europe, as evenhandedly as possible, freeing it from the straitjackets of German and Polish nationalisms, and giving due weight to its Jewish and Czech components." He added that "Microcosm must be acclaimed as exemplary." In the Spectator, meanwhile, Antony Beevor noted the book's "scholarship and objectivity," adding that it "also makes a fascinating story." C.J. Schüler called the book "an impressive and timely history of one of the continent's great cities".

Winfried Irgang, deputy director of the Herder Institute Marburg, criticized the book for a number of technical defects and even factual errors, especially in the sections about Middle Ages and the Habsburg era. Irgang moreover states that Davies is unfamiliar with the subject.

Historian Peter Oliver Loew, scientific Vice-director of the Deutsches Polen-Institut (German Poland Institute), stated that the authors are unfamiliar with the subject and have a tendency to overemphasize the multicultural aspect of the city in order to please the city council, the sponsor of the book. To Loew the work is "largely worthless as a scholarly source".

Hubert Zawadzki, writing in the Slavonic and Eastern European Review wrote that the book has "something of an epic quality", and that it manages to go beyond traditional German versus Polish rivalry in the historiography concerning the city. Furthermore Zawadzki praised the work for containing material of interest both for the specialist historians as well as the lay reader.

Historian Adam Zamoyski also praised the work as remaining "above the national squabbles" and compared Davies and Moorhouse favorably to Fernand Braudel, one of the greatest of the modern historians.

David Isaacson, in a review for The Telegraph stated that the book makes an "excellent contribution" to international understanding.

== See also ==
- History of Poland
