= French Enlightenment =

Intellectual and cultural movement in 18th-century France

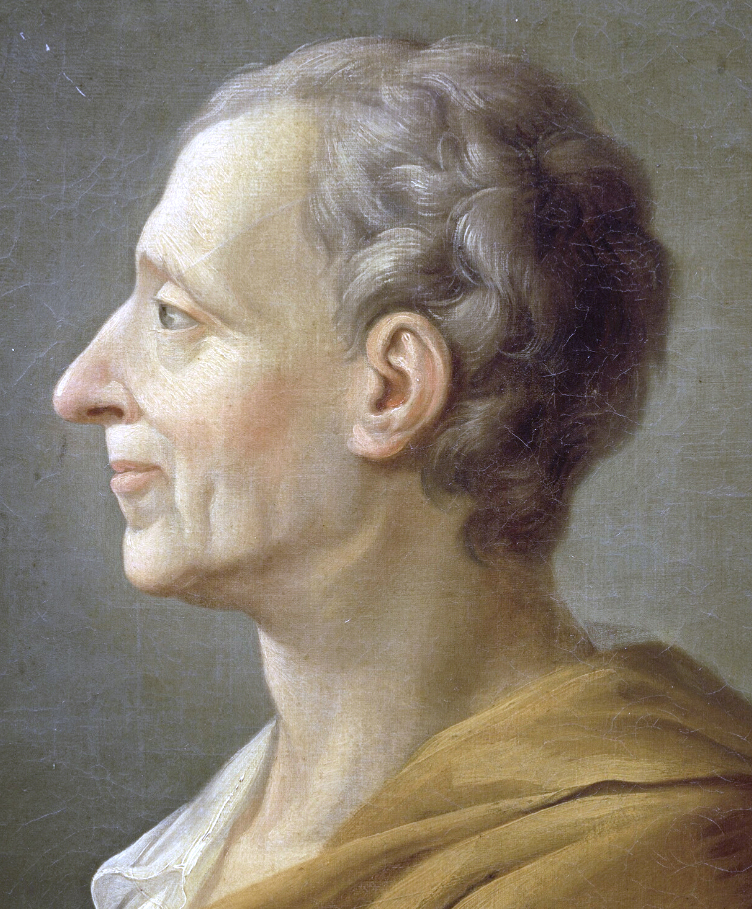
Montesquieu c. 1750

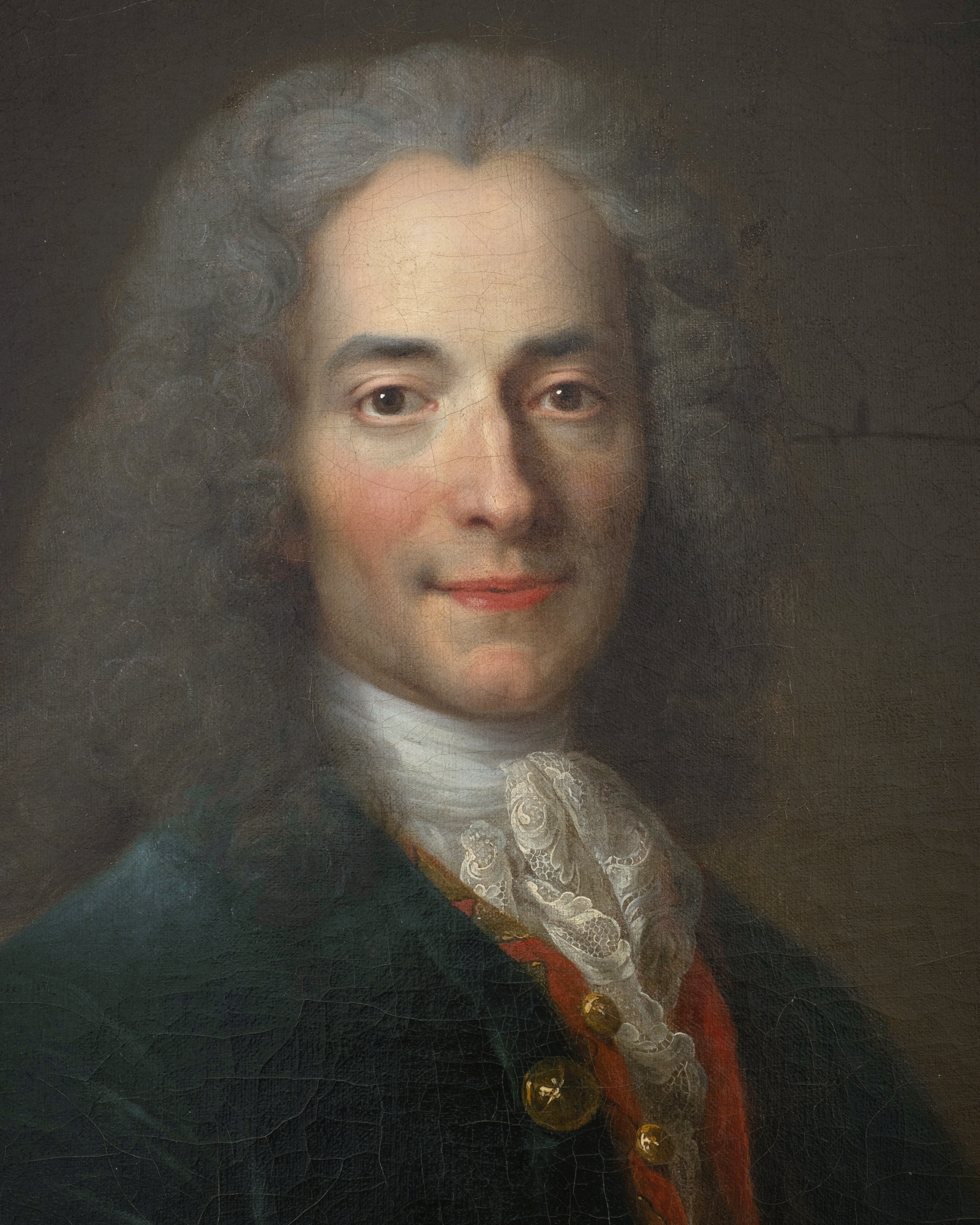
Voltaire c. 1720s

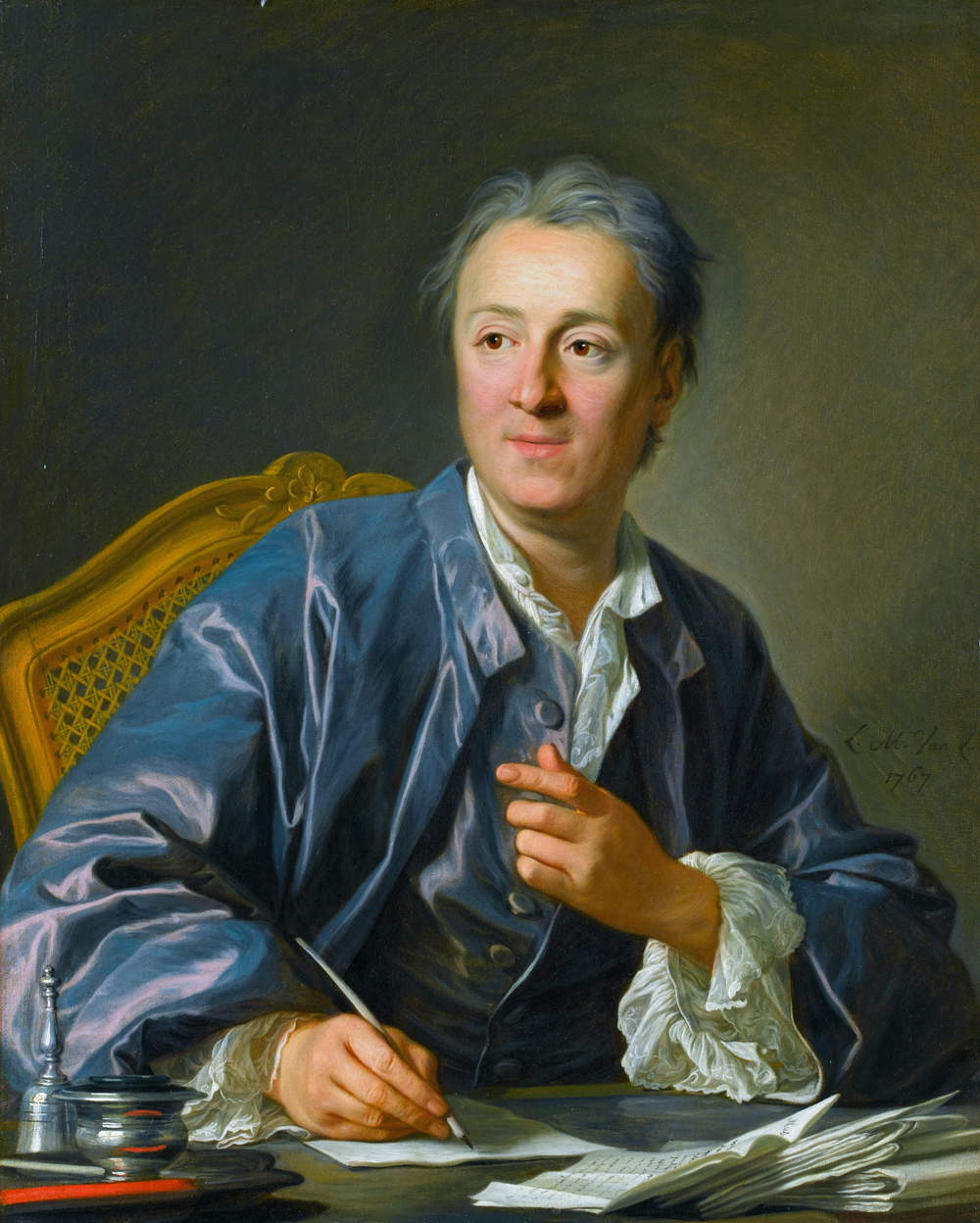
Denis Diderot in 1767

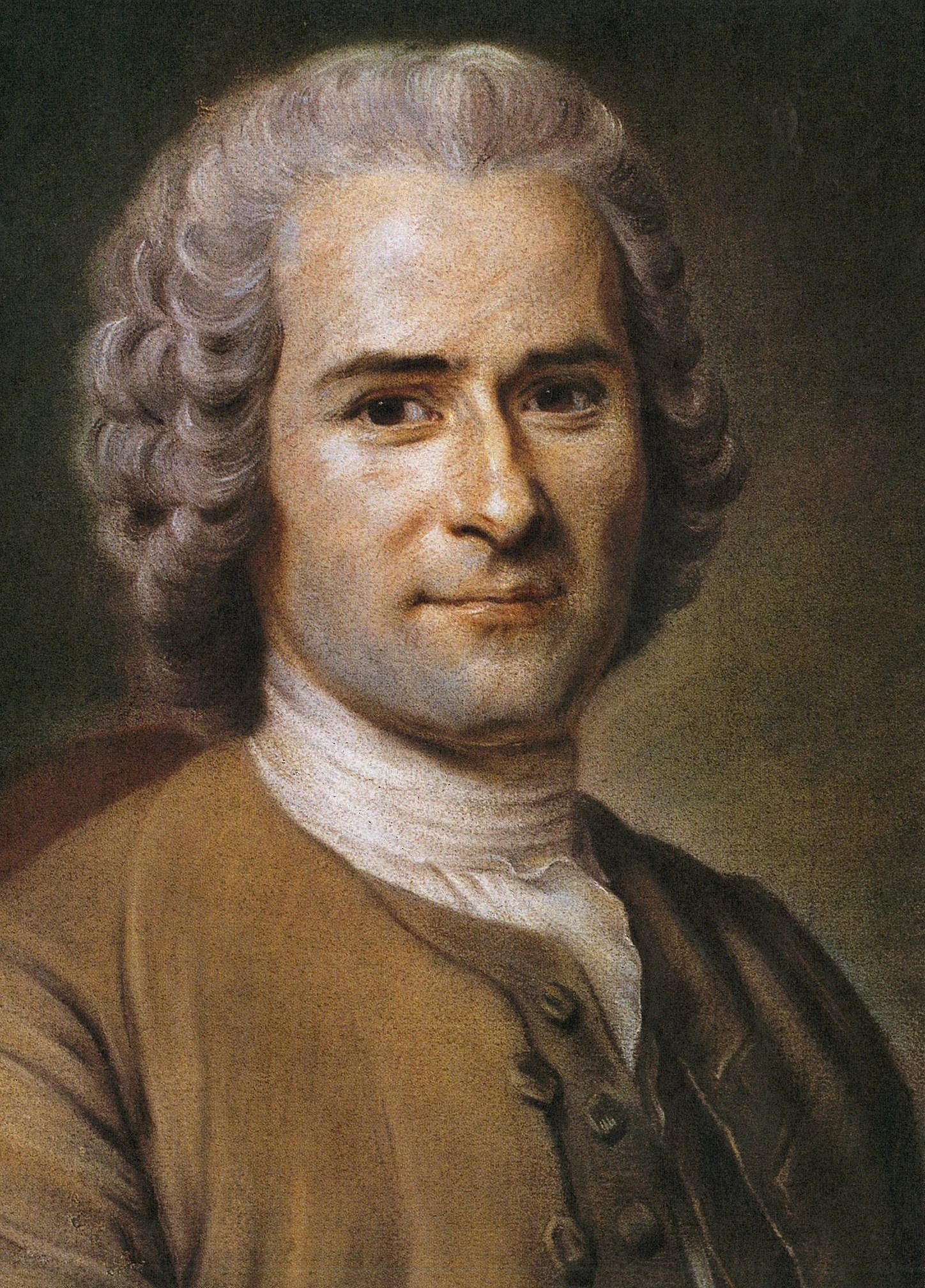
Although Jean-Jacques Rousseau was born in Geneva, he is often considered a major figure of the French Enlightenment. (Portrait by Maurice Quentin de La Tour, 1753)

The French Enlightenment (French: les Lumières françaises, lit. '"the French Lights"') (Note: "The Lights" in question are commonly held to have referred to "the lights of reason".), (1715-1789) was the intellectual and cultural movement that flourished in 18th-century France, forming a central part of the Age of Enlightenment (historically known in French as les Lumières, lit. '"the Lights"'). The movement placed emphasis on reason and skepticism. Philosophers used these modes of thought and applied them to many aspects of human life, including politics, religion and social hierarchies.

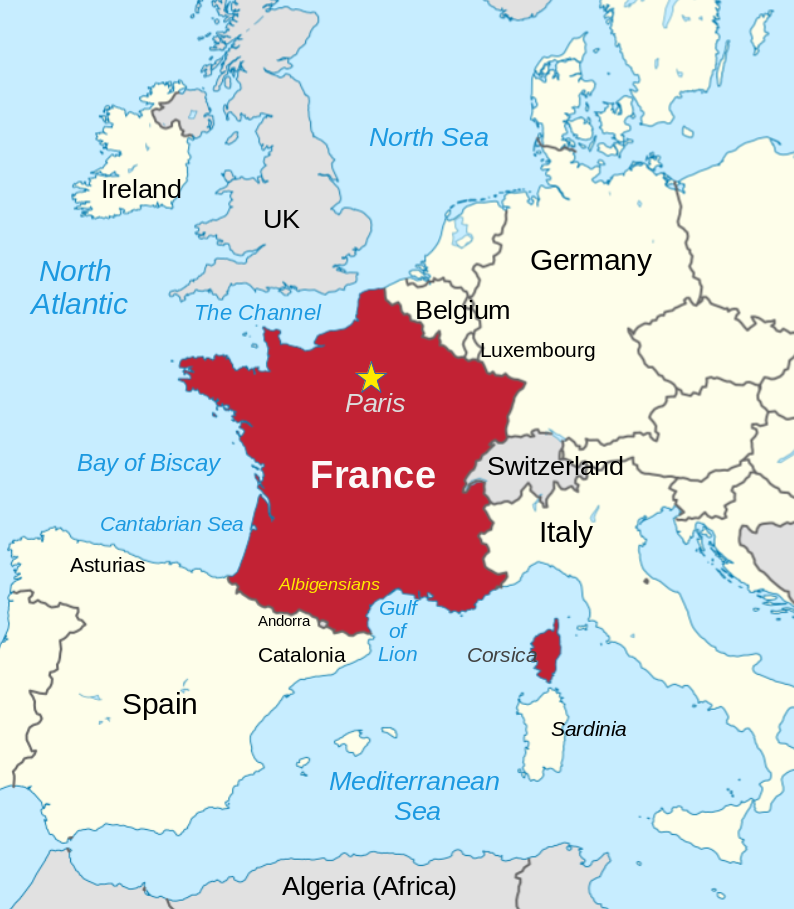
Map of France

The movement drew heavily on the ideas of English thinkers such as John Locke and Isaac Newton, while in turn profoundly shaping other national Enlightenments. It also played a major role in inspiring the French Revolution (1789–1799). According to Sharon A. Stanley, the French Enlightenment was distinctive for its "unrelenting assault on church leadership and theology." Many works critical of the monarchy or the Church were printed in the Dutch Republic, where more liberal press laws allowed them to be smuggled into the Kingdom of France.

Major French Enlightenment figures included Montesquieu, Voltaire and Denis Diderot. Although Jean-Jacques Rousseau was born in Geneva, he is often considered a central figure of the French Enlightenment because of his extensive work in France, his use of the French language, and his significant influence on French political and philosophical thought.

== History ==
Political thought was relatively scarce in the French Enlightenment era prior to the publication of Montesquieu's "The Spirit of Law" in 1748. The publication of "The Spirit of Law" is often thought of as a turning point in politics as it shifted the political focus towards the separation of religion and state. Montesquieu's "Spirit of Law" not only compared different regimes around the world, but it also developed a way to categorize those regimes into categories like monarchies, republics and despotic governments. Montesquieu's works were very influential at the time, and even influenced the writers of The Federalist Papers and the Constitution.

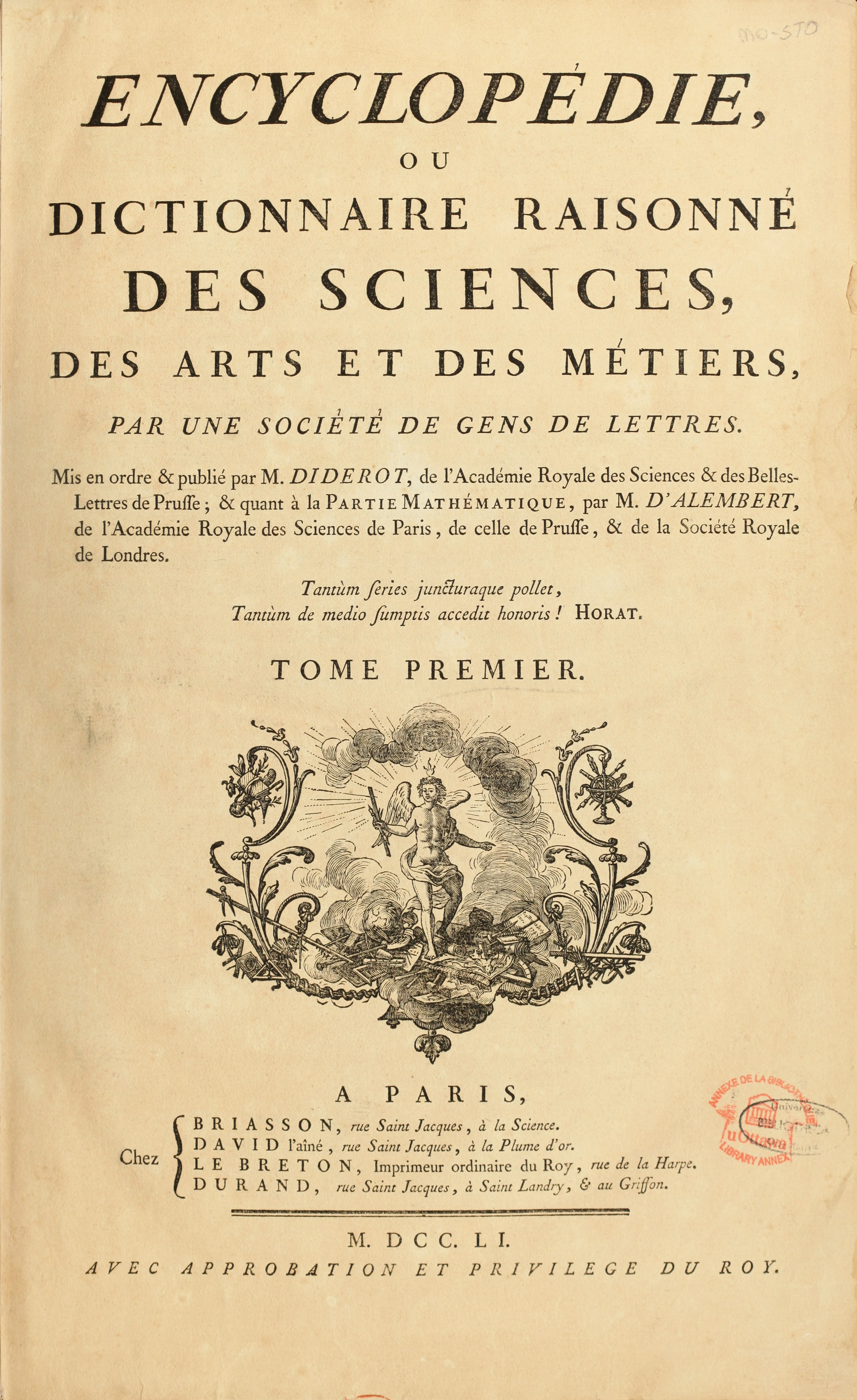
Title page of the Encyclopédie

The "Encyclopédie," edited by Denis Diderot and Jean le Rond d'Alembert and published in 28 volumes between 1751 and 1772, was one of the most important projects of the French Enlightenment. The goal of the "Encyclopédie" was to educate and improve society in France through science, political theory, rationalism, and skepticism about religion and the nature of good. However, the "Encyclopédie" was criticized and censored by the Ancien Regime of France because it challenged their direct rule and the Catholic religion.

The Calas affair was a pivotal case in the French Enlightenment. In 1762, Jean Calas, a Protestant merchant from Toulouse, was wrongfully executed after being accused of murdering his son to prevent his conversion to Catholicism. This case drew the attention of Voltaire, who launched a campaign to clear Calas' name. In 1763, Voltaire wrote "Treatise on Tolerance," highlighting the danger of religious fanaticism. In 1765, after sustained pressure, Calas was officially exonerated.

== Key Figures ==
The French Enlightenment was led by a group of intellectuals known as philosophers. These philosophers published works that brought about social reform.

- Montesquieu: Montesquieu is primarily linked to his theory of the separation of powers. His works also heavily focused on the classifications of governments around the world, and the right for individuals to express themselves freely without fear of punishment from their government.
- Voltaire: Voltaire was a philosopher, writer, poet, historian most notably known for his work on civil liberties, freedom of speech, and the separation of church and state. Voltaire's works were highly controversial in France because they spoke against the religious regime. His works were often written and published outside of France because he was forced to exile the country.
- Diderot: Diderot was a French philosopher and art critic primarily known for his work on the Encyclopédie. His theories were focused on rationalism and his philosophies on arts and sciences.
- Rousseau: Rousseau was a controversial philosopher during the Enlightenment. He is most known for his work, the Discourse on Inequality, in which he blamed all corruption on human behavior. His work was criticized by intellectuals and government officials, and at one point, they were burned publicly in the streets of Paris.

== Women in the Enlightenment ==
Philosophers often talked about women in the Enlightenment. Writers like Rousseau and Voltaire wrote about how women are fundamentally different from men. They talked about how a woman's place was more in the domestic sphere, and how they should stay away from the political and social spheres. Rousseau wrote one of his most notable books, "Emile," about the role that women were supposed to play in society. He described the ideal woman as one who serves her family by breastfeeding her children and educating them. The woman however would never stray from that domestic setting because she would never need a role anywhere else.

Despite what many philosophers wrote about, women were working during the Enlightenment. Most women worked as peasants, laundresses, and shopkeepers. Additionally, women started gathering in salons to discuss art, literature, politics and music. Salons were first hosted by wealthy women, however as they rose in popularity, they became hosted by regular women as well. Salons gave people the opportunity to connect with others from different backgrounds. It also gave people the opportunity to introduce their writing, music, art or theory in a private setting to receive feedback before publishing it to the public. These salons were one of the most influential ways Enlightenment thinking spread across France.

=== Olympe de Gouges ===
One of the most influential women writers and activists during the Enlightenment was Olympe de Gouges. De Gouges was born in 1748 in southern France. When she was 17 years old, she was forced into a marriage with Louis Yves Aubry by her mother. She had one son, Pierre Aubry, with her husband before he was killed in a flood. Although she never remarried, she did start an affair with a wealthy French merchant, which caused her to move to Paris. In Paris, de Gouges began to frequent salons. There she started to meet philosophers and began discussing and developing literature.

De Gouges began writing in the 1780s, and wrote over 40 plays. One of her most famous plays is "L'Esclavage des Noirs," which focuses on the journey of two Black slaves. The play very heavily critiqued slavery, and was met with very strong opposition which caused it to only be performed three times.

She was also very focused on fighting for women's rights. She published the "Declaration of the Rights of Woman" and the "Female Citizen," as a way to criticize French society for the oppression of women. Her works got her into trouble with the government, and she was guillotined in November 1793.

== Slavery and the Enlightenment ==
Philosophers also drew distinctions between Black and White people during the Enlightenment as a way to justify slavery. The Enlightenment stood on the idea that everyone deserved to have the freedom to think for themselves and act in a way that benefits them. However, this was at a time where slavery still existed. As a result, philosophers, such as Voltaire, began researching the state of nature for humans in order to prove that slavery wasn't going against the views of the Enlightenment. Voltaire wrote that the differences between Black and White people were a result of natural hierarchy. He wrote that White people “are superior to Negroes, just like Negroes are superior to monkeys, and monkeys are superior to oysters.” He didn't try to justify it through moral reasoning, instead he chose to justify it through scientific means.

== Influence on other enlightenments ==
"French anti-clericalism briefly dominated German Enlightenment thought". The Hungarian Enlightenment was greatly influenced by the French Enlightenment (through Vienna).

== Sources ==
- Butterwick, Richard (1998). Poland's Last King and English Culture.
- Forsyth, Murray (1987). Reason and Revolution: The Political Thought of the Abbé Sieyes.
- Fœssel, Michaël (2009). "Refaire les Lumières ?". Esprit (in French) (357). JSTOR 24269146.
- Hazard, Paul (2013) [1935]. The Crisis of the European Mind: 1680–1715. Translated by May, James Lewis. New York: New York Review Books. ISBN 978-1590176191.
- Kim, Mi Gyung (2008) [2003]. Affinity, That Elusive Dream: A Genealogy of the Chemical Revolution. Transformations: Studies in the History of Science and Technology. Cambridge, Massachusetts: The MIT Press. ISBN 978-0262612234.
- Stanley, Sharon A. (2012). The French Enlightenment and the Emergence of Modern Cynicism.
- Wade, Ira O. (1977). The Structure and Form of the French Enlightenment. Vol. 1. Princeton University Press. JSTOR j.ctt13x11rw.
