= Teresa Remiszewska =

Polish sailor, journalist

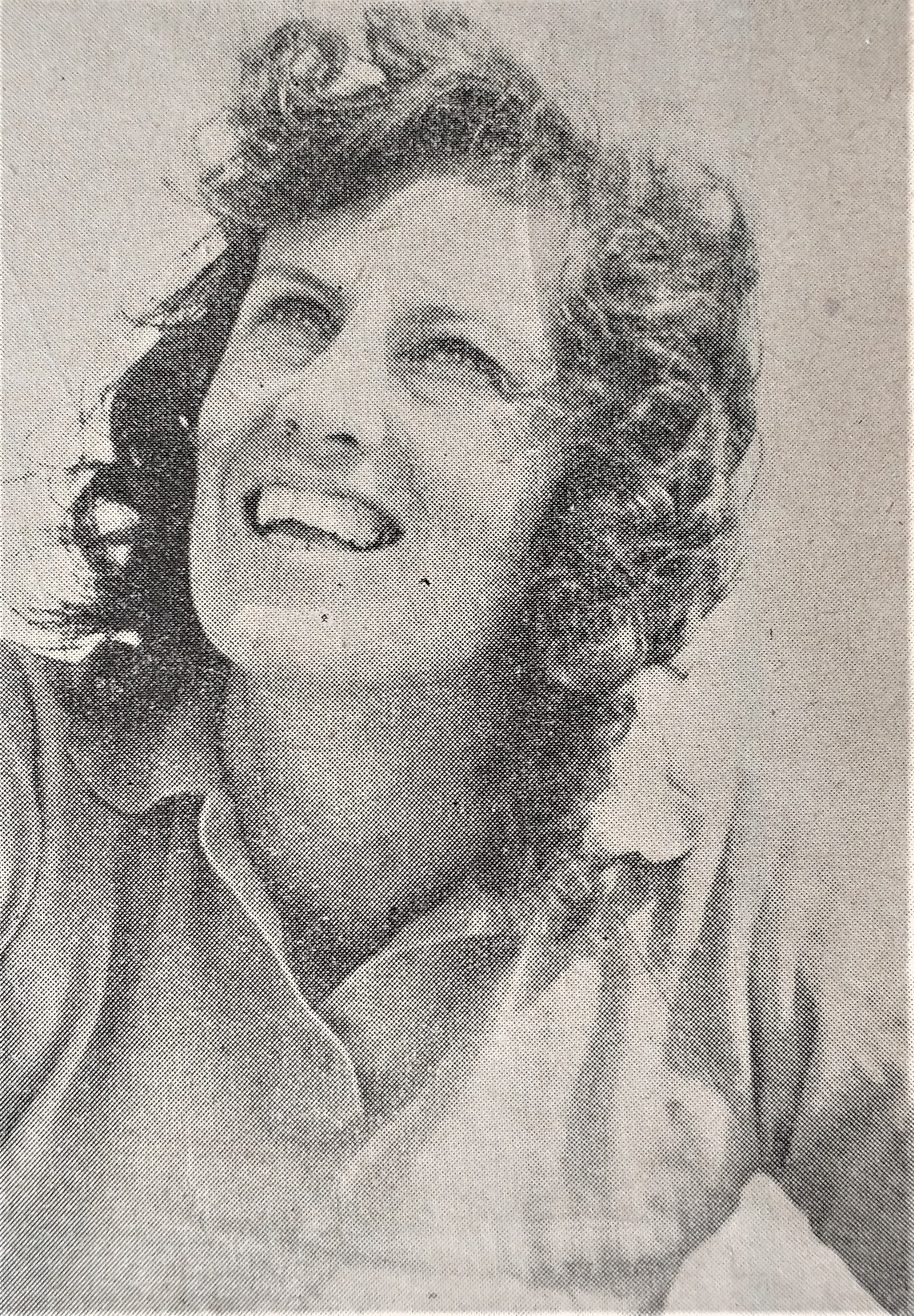
- Teresa Remiszewska in 1973
- Born: June 19, 1928; Międzychód, Poznań Voivodeship, Poland
- Died: March 2, 2002 (aged 73); Sopot, Pomeranian Voivodeship, Poland
- Occupations: Sailor, journalist, political activist
- Known for: Polish women's solo sailing pioneer
- Spouse: Jerzy Damsz (1911–1987)
- Children: Two
- Parents: Kazimierz (father); Jadwiga (mother)
- Writing career
- Pen name: Urszula Karpinska
- Notable work: Translated Orzeł biały, czerwona gwiazda

Teresa Remiszewska (born 19 June 1928 in Międzychód, Poland – died 2 March 2002 in Sopot) was a Polish sailor, yacht captain, sailing instructor and pioneer of women's solo sailing in Poland. She was also a journalist and jailed in late 1982 for her political activism.

== Life and work ==
Teresa was the youngest of three daughters born to Jadwiga and Kazimierz Remiszewski. During the German occupation of Poland during World War II, she was educated in clandestine classes, and after the war ended, she studied at the Jagiellonian University in Kraków.

She married the first time in 1948 and moved to Nowa Huta. From 1965 on, after her divorce, she lived in Gdynia, taking jobs at the yacht clubs Stal and Gryf, and then at the Paris Commune Shipyard as a yacht captain and sailing instructor.

=== Voyages ===
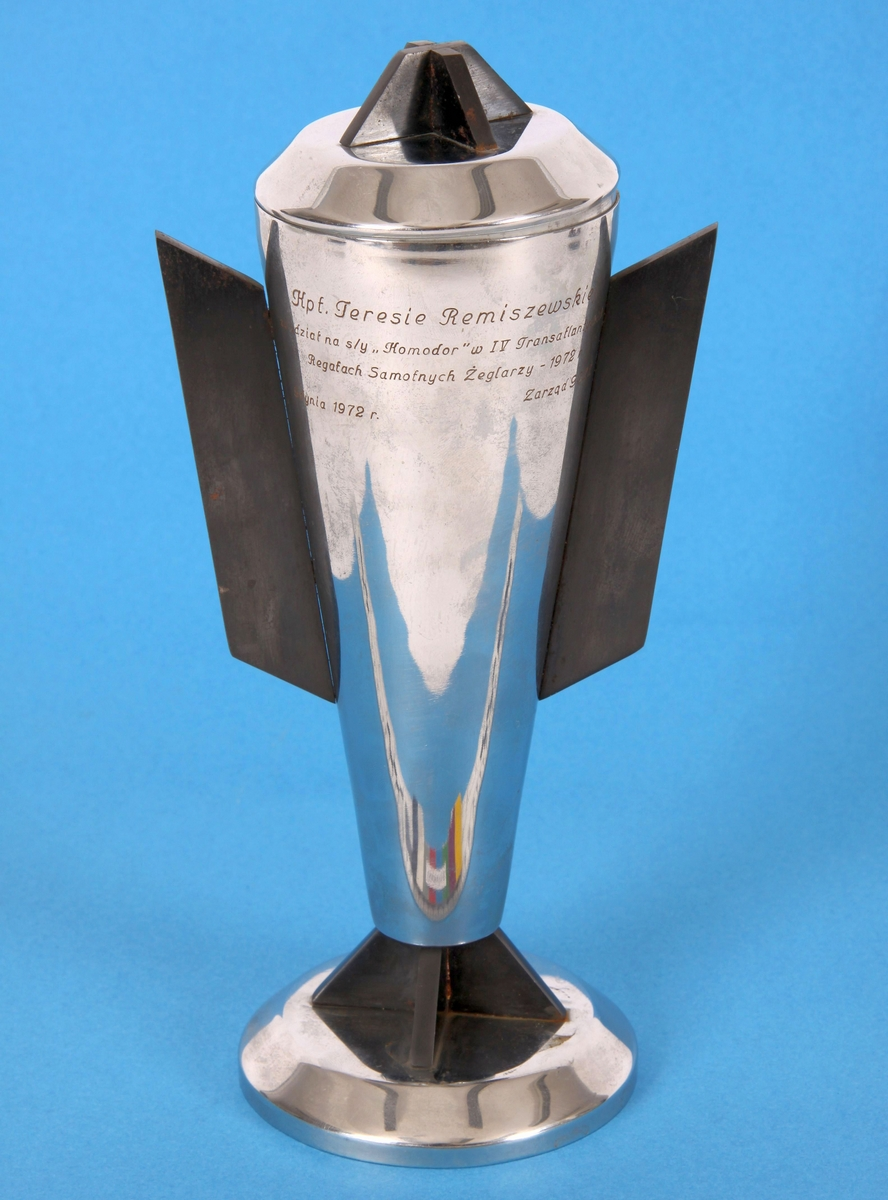
Cup of Polish Sailing Association in Gdańsk for Teresa Remiszewska.

In 1970, she was the first Polish woman to make a solo voyage around the Baltic Sea on the yacht Zenit, taking a 690-mile route. For this feat, she was nicknamed "First Lady of the Baltic Sea" and received the 3rd "Cruise of the Year" award in 1970. The cruise and the award brought her popularity, which allowed her to participate in the Fourth OSTAR Transatlantic Regatta of Solitary Sailors two years later.

Sailing single-handed aboard the yacht Komodor in 1972, Remiszewska became the fourth woman in sailing history to cross the Atlantic alone (in a time of 57 days, 3 hours and 18 minutes) and described her ocean voyage to the United States in her book Out of the Bitterness of Salt, My Joy, which was reissued in 2019 by the Bernardinum Publishing House.

While in the United States, she met Jerzy Damsz (1911–1987), the last commander of the 307th Night Fighter Squadron in England, and they married. After the couple returned to Poland, Damsz's return after 35 years of emigration resulted in a secret service investigation by the Polish communist authorities for espionage. Although the charges were brought against her husband, they prevented Remiszewska from organizing the first solo female sailing voyage around the world.

=== Journalist ===
In the late 1970s and early 1980s, she worked in the editorial department of the magazine Sails and Motor Yachting. She was also a political activist and worked in the environmental protection committee of the National Covenant Commission of the Solidarity Polish trade union. For her political activism during martial law, she was detained on 23 December 1982 after a co-worker's denunciation and then arrested, remaining incarcerated from 24 December 1982 to 21 March 1983. The proceedings against her were dropped in 1983.

Under the pseudonym Urszula Karpinska, Remiszewska translated Norman Davies' work White Eagle, Red Star, covering the Polish–Soviet War and printed by the Polish underground press.

=== Honors and awards ===
For her sailing accomplishments, she was honored with, among other things: an entry in the Pantheon of Gdynia, a Star in the Avenue of Distinguished Sea People in Rewa and a plaque in the Avenue of Polish Sailing in the Mariusz Zaruski Basin in Gdynia.

== Personal life ==
She had a son and daughter: Andrzej, a shipbuilding engineer and Danuta who became the youngest person to obtain a yacht captain's license in Poland.

Remiszewska is buried with Damsz in the municipal cemetery in Sopot, Poland (section N4-19-14).
