= The Devils' Alliance: Hitler's Pact with Stalin, 1939–1941 =

History book by Roger Moorhouse

- First edition
- Author: Roger Moorhouse
- Language: English
- Subject: Molotov–Ribbentrop Pact
- Genre: Non-fiction
- Publisher: Bodley Head
- Publication date: 2014
- Publication place: United Kingdom

The Devils' Alliance: Hitler's Pact with Stalin, 1939–1941 is a 2014 book by the British historian Roger Moorhouse about the Molotov–Ribbentrop Pact.

Despite praising the book for its "masterly" account of the signing of the Molotov–Ribbentrop Pact, the historian Richard J. Evans, writing for The Guardian, took exception to the book's "unbalanced treatment" of the crimes of the Soviets over those of the Nazis and asserted that "for all its virtues this is a deeply problematic book". Other reviewers of the book were more positive. The Wall Street Journal described it as "superb" and The Daily Telegraph listed it among its Books of the Year for 2014.
