= White Eagle, Red Star =

1972 book by Norman Davies

- Author: Norman Davies
- Language: English
- Subject: Polish-Soviet War
- Publisher: Macdonald
- Publication date: 1972
- Publication place: United States

White Eagle, Red Star: The Polish–Soviet War, 1919–20 is a 1972 nonfiction book written by Norman Davies and covering the Polish–Soviet War. The monograph is Davies's first book.

It is considered by many historians to be one of the best English-language books on the subject. A. J. P. Taylor, who wrote its foreword, also wrote: "Norman Davies's book is a permanent contribution to historical knowledge and international understanding."

== Editions ==
The book had several editions and translations:

ISBNs:

For Pimlico; new edition (27 Nov 2003)

1. ISBN 0-7126-0694-7
2. ISBN 978-0-7126-0694-3

For Orbis Books (London) Ltd; revised edition (Jan 1984)

1. ISBN 0-901149-23-3
2. ISBN 978-0-901149-23-7

For Birlinn Ltd (30 Nov 2000)

1. ISBN 1-84158-083-X
2. ISBN 978-1-84158-083-8

For Macdonald (13 Jul 1972)

1. ISBN 0-356-04013-5
2. ISBN 978-0-356-04013-4

Other language editions:

- Polish bibuła underground translations (one by Teresa Remiszewska under the pseudonym Urszula Karpinska) – two printings in 1987 and 1988
- Orzeł Biały, Czerwona Gwiazda (in Polish), Wydawnictwo Znak, 1997, ISBN 83-7006-761-1.
