= The Isles: A History =

History book by Norman Davies

- Cover of the first edition
- Author: Norman Davies
- Language: English
- Subject: History of the British Isles
- Published: 1999
- Publication place: United Kingdom
- Media type: Print
- ISBN: 978-0195134421

The Isles: A History is a 1999 narrative history book by Norman Davies.

== Content ==
As in his earlier Europe: A History (1996), Davies is not trying to present any new history, but does want to tackle what he sees as historiographical biases in the treatment of the history of Britain and Ireland. Ten chapters span the past of the archipelago from prehistory till the present day. The chapters each begin with a specific story to illustrate each period, which is described as a 'snapshot'.

In the introduction, Davies describes the difficulties of even defining what is being described by the words people use for the history of the area, and even their definition today. This includes the term 'British'; the idea that 'Britain is an island'; the position of Ireland in the picture; the problem of the United Kingdom not appearing to have a history where everything is treated as 'Great Britain'. In the title of the book he wanted to avoid the term British Isles but also the various clumsy alternatives that had arisen in recent years (see also British Isles naming dispute).

Also, he wanted to avoid anachronistic terms in the work, such as using names from other times to describe cultures or geography. So for example, instead of using the term 'Wessex culture' in the Bronze Age he uses 'Flanged-Sword culture'. Instead of British Isles in the prehistory section he uses 'Midnight Isles'. These terms are explained separately in the appendices and notes. Davies notes in his introduction that the book is a personal view and that his work is "the view of one pair of eyes".

== Reception ==
Stefan Berger has approached The Isles as a major reinterpretation of British history. He states that Davies, "seeks to liberate the national histories of Ireland, Scotland and Wales from the fading grip of Britishness....Davies is about destroying the old national master narrative for Britain in order to liberate national master narratives for the four constituent parts of the Isles.
