= Vanished Kingdoms =

2011 book by Norman Davies

Vanished Kingdoms: The History of Half-Forgotten Europe
- First edition
- Author: Norman Davies
- Publisher: Allen Lane
- Pages: 830
- ISBN: 9781846143380
- OCLC: 858560499

Vanished Kingdoms: The History of Half-Forgotten Europe (sometimes referred to with another subtitle as Vanished Kingdoms: Exploring Europe's Lost Realms) is a history book about fourteen former European countries, such as the Grand Duchy of Lithuania, Kingdom of Galicia and Lodomeria, Kingdom of Aragon and Prussia, written by the English historian Norman Davies. It was published by Allen Lane in 2011.
