= Reich Ministry of Public Enlightenment and Propaganda =

Nazi government agency

- Reichsministerium für Volksaufklärung und Propaganda (German)

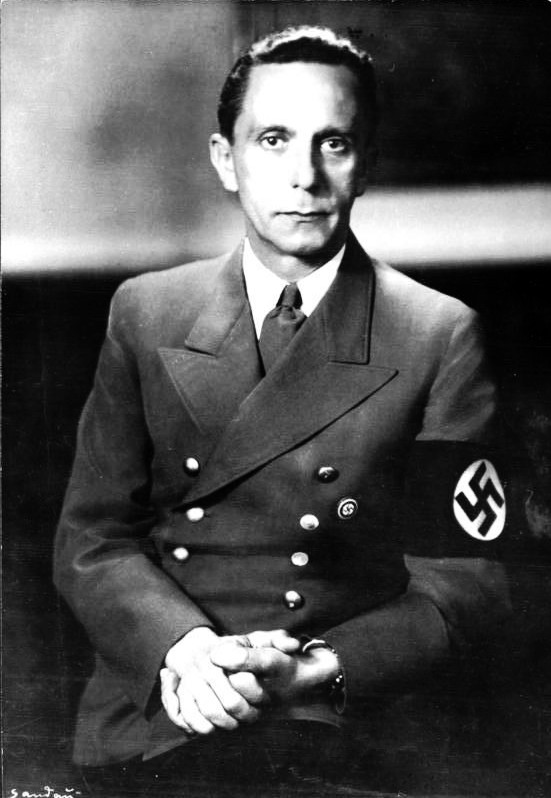
- Propaganda Minister Joseph Goebbels in 1942

Ministry overview
- Formed: 13 March 1933
- Dissolved: 5 May 1945
- Jurisdiction: Government of the Weimar Republic (until 1934); Government of Nazi Germany (from 1934)
- Headquarters: Ordenspalais Wilhelmplatz 8/9, Berlin-Mitte; 52°30′45″N 13°23′1″E
- Employees: 2,000 (1939)
- Annual budget: 14 million ℛℳ (1933) (€65 million in 2021); 187 million ℛℳ (1941) (€803 million in 2021)
- Ministers responsible: Joseph Goebbels; Werner Naumann
- Child agencies: Reich Chamber of Culture; Reich Chamber of Film

The Reich Ministry for Public Enlightenment and Propaganda (Reichsministerium für Volksaufklärung und Propaganda, RMVP), also known simply as the Ministry of Propaganda (Propagandaministerium), was a government department that controlled the content of the press, literature, visual arts, film, theater, music and radio in Nazi Germany.

The ministry was created as the central institution of Nazi propaganda shortly after the party's national seizure of power in January 1933. In the Hitler cabinet, it was headed by Propaganda Minister Joseph Goebbels, who exercised control over all German mass media and creative artists through his ministry and the Reich Chamber of Culture (Reichskulturkammer), which was established in the autumn of 1933. It was abolished by the Flensburg Government on 5 May 1945.

== Establishment and functions ==
Shortly after the March 1933 Reichstag elections, Adolf Hitler presented his cabinet with a draft resolution to establish the ministry. Despite the skepticism of some non-National Socialist ministers, Hitler pushed the resolution through. On 13 March 1933, Reich President Paul von Hindenburg issued a decree ordering the establishment of a Reich Ministry for Public Enlightenment and Propaganda (Reichsministerium für Volksaufklärung und Propaganda; RMVP). At the time, Propaganda was value neutral. In today's terms, the ministry could be understood to have had a name that meant roughly "Ministry for Culture, Media and Public Relations".

The ministry moved into the 18th-century Ordenspalais building across from the Reich Chancellery in Berlin, then used by the United Press Department of the Reich Government (Vereinigten Presseabteilung der Reichsregierung). It had been responsible for coordinating the Weimar Republic's official press releases but by then had been incorporated into the Nazi state. On 25 March 1933 Goebbels explained the future function of the Ministry of Propaganda to broadcasting company directors:

"The Ministry has the task of carrying out an intellectual mobilization in Germany. In the field of the spirit it is thus the same as the Ministry of Defense in the field of security. [...] Spiritual mobilization [is] just as necessary, perhaps even more necessary, than making the people materially able to defend themselves."

In an address about the propaganda film Triumph of the Will, Joseph Goebbels emphasized that propaganda was most effective when its recipients were unaware they were consuming it. The ministry was tailored for Goebbels, who had been the Reich propaganda leader of the Nazi Party since April 1930. By a decree of 30 June 1933, numerous functions of other ministries were transferred under the responsibility of the new ministry. The role of the new ministry was to centralise Nazi control of all aspects of German cultural, mass media and intellectual life for the country.

== Structure ==
The RMVP grew steadily. It began in 1933 with five departments and 350 employees. A first plan for the distribution of responsibilities dated 1 October 1933 listed seven departments: Administration and Law (I), Propaganda (II), Broadcasting (III), Press (IV), Film (V), Theater, Music and Art (VI) and Security (VII, subtitled "security against lies at home and abroad"). By 1939, 2,000 employees worked in 17 departments. From 1933 to 1941 the RMVP's budget increased from 14 to 187 million Reichsmarks. Reich Minister Goebbels was ultimately in charge of three state secretaries and the departments they headed:

- State Secretary I – Walther Funk (1933–1937), Otto Dietrich (1937–1945): German press, foreign press, periodical press.
- State Secretary II – Karl Hanke (1937–1940), Leopold Gutterer (1941–1944), Werner Naumann (1944–1945): Budget, Law, Propaganda, Broadcasting, Film, Personnel, National Defense, Foreign Affairs, Theater, Music, Literature, Visual Arts
- State Secretary III – Hermann Esser (1935–1945): Tourism

=== Film department ===
With the establishment of Department V (Film), the Propaganda Ministry became the most important body for the German film industry alongside the Reich Chamber of Culture and the Reich Film Chamber. Initially little changed in the formal structure of German film censorship after the founding of the RMVP. The inspection and review offices that had existed since 1920 (notably the central film inspection office) were incorporated into the RMVP's Film Department, which was headed by state secretary (Ministerialrat) Ernst Seeger, who had headed the Weimar Republic's Reich Film Office in the Ministry of the Interior since 1919. Fritz Hippler, director of the 1940 antisemitic Nazi propaganda film The Eternal Jew, followed him in 1939 and then Hans Hinkel in April 1944.

The department had five divisions: film and cinema law, film industry, film abroad, film newsreels, and film dramaturgy. In 1938 the German Film Academy at Babelsberg, the first state-run German training center for film artists, was added as an additional department. The head of the film department also assumed responsibility for the production of certain feature-length documentaries and was in charge of the newsreel Deutsche Wochenschau (German Weekly Review). He supervised the completion of the newsreels and saw to it that they were favorably placed in cinema programs.

== Influence on the press, film and broadcasting ==
=== Reich press conferences ===
The main instrument of press control was the Reich press conference. One was held daily at the RMVP beginning 1 July 1933; the press releases issued between 1933 and 1945 number between 80,000 and 100,000. Selected press representatives often received very detailed instructions as to which reports were to be published and in what form. The instructions affected all parts of reporting and sometimes dealt with quite banal events. Bans and explicit language regulations were at first rarely issued in order to avoid complete uniformity in the daily press's content. The RMVP's control of the press was based instead on a principle of indirect pre-censorship and direct post-publication censorship. After reviewing the relevant articles, the ministry followed up with either praise or censure.

The participants in the Reich press conference were obligated to destroy the instructions issued to them after they had been implemented. Newspapers that did not have correspondents in Berlin received the instructions in writing as "Confidential Information". The Deutsche Allgemeine Zeitung, the Berliner Tageblatt and the Frankfurter Zeitung were responsible for the highest number of violations of the RMVP's dictates. The journalist Walter Schwerdtfeger was imprisoned for treason until 1945 because he passed the RMVP's instructions on to the foreign press. Employees of the Frankfurter Zeitung and the national daily newspaper offices nevertheless resisted the order and hid their notes. Some are still extant in the German Federal Archives.

There were additional press conferences on other topics such as culture and business. Press conference for correspondents of the foreign press were held twice daily after March 1938 by the RMVP and once per day by the Foreign Office.

=== Film censorship ===
On 9 February 1934, in a speech to the Reich Professional Group Film (Reichsfachschaft Film), Goebbels described film as "one of the most modern and far-reaching means of influencing the masses".

The head of the film department, like Goebbels himself, could suggest ideas and themes, commission scripts and with all the means at his disposal support films that for example served military or foreign policy interests. He and Goebbels were also entitled to clean up "mistakes of taste" and "artistic errors" and to stop unpopular film projects altogether. After the revision of the Reich Film Law in 1934, the "violation of National Socialist, moral or artistic sensibilities" was included as a reason for prohibition. Every film project had to be approved before filming began, after the Reich film dramaturge had checked the script.

=== Die Deutsche Wochenschau ===
The RMVP's Film Department was also responsible for the Deutsche Wochenschau (German Weekly Review), which by 1940 had begun to surpass the press in its influence on public awareness. More than 300 film reporters, some of them part of so-called propaganda companies, were deployed on behalf of the High Command of the Wehrmacht in the army, navy and air force as well as the Waffen-SS. Their material was centrally edited and set to music by the RMVP. In addition to reporting on the war, the Wochenschau presented current political and cultural events in a propagandistic manner.

The carefully staged film reports were well received by cinema audiences and had a considerable propaganda effect. In 1942 the Wochenschau was shown in almost all German cinemas as a 20-minute compilation of various film reports before the main film and reached 20 million moviegoers per week.

=== Radio ===
By a decree of 30 June 1933, the regional broadcasting corporations were forcibly coordinated and incorporated into the Reich Broadcasting Corporation, which was subordinate to the RMVP. At Goebbels' instigation, it was renamed Greater German Broadcasting (Großdeutscher Rundfunk) on 1 January 1939. It broadcast a unified program for the Reich starting in June 1940.

== Overlapping areas of responsibility ==
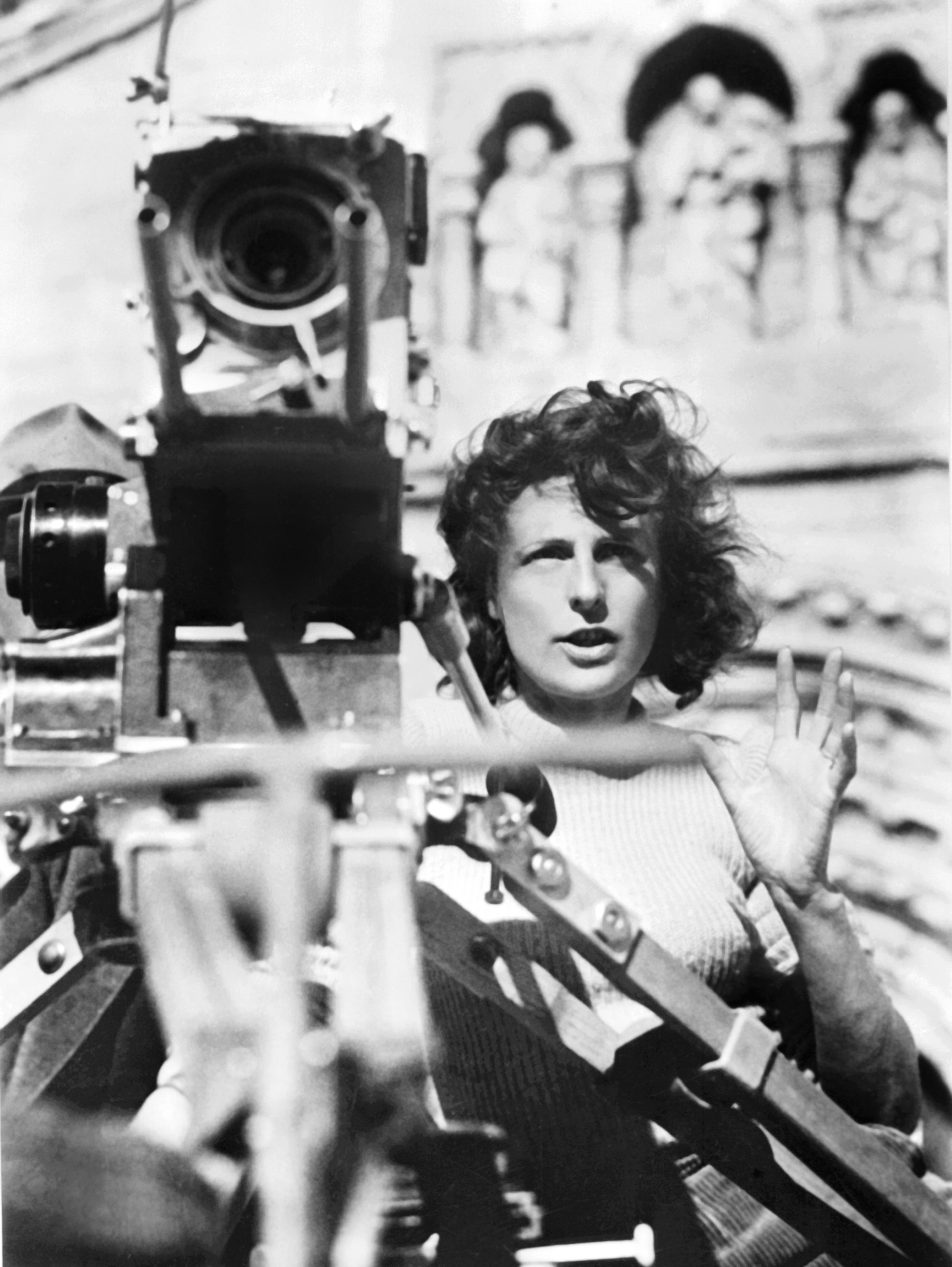
Leni Riefenstahl, 1940

Numerous tasks of the Propaganda Ministry overlapped with the jurisdictions of other organizations which were interconnected by a complex network of personnel and that were also partly under Goebbels' direction. As a professional organization, the Reich Chamber of Culture controlled and supervised creative artists in theater, radio, film and the press. At the Nazi Party level, there were three Reich leaders with media jurisdiction whose areas of responsibility overlapped: the Reich propaganda leader Joseph Goebbels, the Reich leader for the press Max Amann, and the Reich press chief Otto Dietrich. The latter, as vice president of the Reich Press Chamber, was in turn Goebbels' subordinate in his role as president of the Reich Chamber of Culture. Due to power struggles, personal enmities and mutual dependencies, contradictory directives were sometimes issued by the various offices. For the 1936 Summer Olympics, direct responsibility lay with the Reich Ministry of the Interior, which was responsible for sports. However, since Goebbels had met with the president of the organizing committee Theodor Lewald three days after taking office and had reached far-reaching agreements with him, he was able to involve himself at all levels. In the film Olympia by Leni Riefenstahl, the power of the propaganda can still be seen.

Heated disputes arose over the responsibility for foreign propaganda, for which the Reich Foreign Ministry claimed general competence. The influence on internal Italian reporting, for example, remained entirely in the hands of the Foreign Office since diplomatic tact was called for in dealing with Germany's Axis partner. Since regulations and prohibitions were not appropriate when directed at a sovereign state, the Foreign Office instead flooded the Italian Propaganda Ministry with finished news pieces from all over the world – news that was more detailed and up-to-date than the Italian correspondents' material and was therefore frequently taken up by newspapers and radio. Although Hitler's directive of 8 September 1939 clearly established the leading role of the Foreign Office in foreign propaganda, Goebbels and his Ministry continued to interfere in the area until the end of the war.

== See also ==
- Propaganda in Nazi Germany
  - Children's propaganda in Nazi Germany
- Reich Chamber of Culture
  - Reich Chamber of Music
- Ministry of Popular Culture
- Cabinet Intelligence Bureau

== Bibliography ==
- Longerich, Peter (2015). Goebbels: A Biography. New York: Random House. ISBN 978-1400067510.
- Manvell, Roger; Fraenkel, Heinrich (2010) [1960]. Doctor Goebbels: his Life and Death. New York: Skyhorse. ISBN 978-1-61608-029-7.
