= Berlin at War: Life and Death in Hitler's Capital, 1939–45 =

Berlin at War: Life and Death in Hitler's Capital, 1939–45 is a 2010 non-fiction book by the British historian Roger Moorhouse about everyday life in Berlin during World War II, as seen from the viewpoint of its residents. The book draws on diaries, letters, newspaper articles and other written accounts by ordinary Germans who lived in Berlin, but also prominent officials of the Third Reich such as Joseph Goebbels or Albert Speer, as well as foreign journalists, Berlin's Jews, and others. Many of these accounts were not published before.

== Contents ==
The book opens with an introduction describing the military parade and overall atmosphere in the city on 20 April 1939, when the Nazi regime celebrated Adolf Hitler's 50th birthday. The majority of ordinary Berliners, the author contends, observed and enjoyed the festivities without realizing that they foreshadowed a war that was to begin by the end of the year. They had already been used to sabre-rattling that never before resulted in international military conflicts and many were convinced that the regime only sought to re-establish the nation's sense of dignity and self-confidence.

Even after the war officially began with Germany's invasion of Poland on 1 September 1939, most Berliners saw it as a local skirmish and didn't think that it marked the beginning of a disastrous war that would last for years and result in millions of victims. The book goes on to show them as people living in a totalitarian dictatorship who tried to live as best they could amid propaganda, scarcity caused by shortages of food and fuel, anxiety due to frequent RAF air raids, worry for their friends and family at the front, as well as a perpetual sense of uncertainty. Still, the author doesn't downplay their personal responsibility. He shows numerous examples of indifference, opportunism or turning a blind eye out of fear, necessity or misinformation caused by propaganda. Rumors of atrocities suffered by Berlin's Jews, for example, did circulate among the broader population. But they mostly went unconfirmed and were difficult to believe.

... there was an 'imagination gap' with regard to the Holocaust. Most Berliners would have found it hard to believe the grim truth of the Holocaust, even had they known it. And those, on both sides, who had an inkling of what was going on were often unwilling to believe that their darkest suspicions could possibly be true. The idea that an entire race of people could systematically be killed on an industrial scale was beyond the imagination of most people.

However, the author also narrates about examples of immense personal bravery and risk, including stories of Beppo Römer, Ruth Andreas-Friedrich, Christabel Bielenberg, and many more famous and less famous members of resistance movements.

Every chapter is devoted to a single facet or topic of everyday life: blackouts, forced labor, radio propaganda, surveillance, air raids, treatment of Jews, evacuation of German children to Hitler Youth camps, crime in Berlin, the Germania project, underground resistance, and so on. It ends with the account of the Battle of Berlin.

Apart from talking about Berliners themselves, the book also outlines Berlin's urban geography at the time, talking about infamous landmarks such as Kroll Opera House, Schwerbelastungskörper, Anhalter Station and others, many of which were bombed or otherwise destroyed.

== Reception ==
The book received generally favorable reviews, but it was also criticized for losing sight of the big picture amid all the details. The Telegraph's Ian Thomson writes: "For all his mesmeric accumulation of detail, Moorhouse does not really answer the central question: how an outwardly civilised nation was able to commit such a crime as the murder of all the Jews within its jurisdiction."

Kirkus Reviews called the book "a superb addition to the social history of Nazi Germany". The author was praised for his minute descriptions of hitherto unknown or lesser known details about the daily life and occurrences in the center of Hitler's war machinery. "The big stuff, including the final battle through the ruins, we've read before, but not the mean details of degradation – the stink of halitosis in bunkers after Germans could no longer find a dentist – or the surreal stories, such as that of the S-Bahn train serial killer, an upstanding Nazi party member who was caught by patient detection after murdering eight women. Most Berliners were never free from the silence, fear, want and loss that they had imposed across Europe", writes Vera Rule for The Guardian.

Historian Andrew Roberts appreciates the fact that Moorhouse has helped fill a surprisingly huge gap of Berlin's wartime history. In his view, "Moorhouse is particularly good with the small-arms fire of history, those illuminating details or unknown life-stories that shed light on a phenomenon of Berlin life, such as the sign in the shop window that read: 'Goods displayed in this window are absolutely not for sale', or the problems that Berliners who had sheltered Jews had in disposing of the bodies of those who had died in their care."

Apart from praising the author's "meticulous and painstaking research", the cultural historian C. J. Schüler also admires his "narrative verve, wide-ranging sympathy and eye for telling detail."
