= Heart of Europe =

1984 book by Norman Davies

Heart of Europe: A Short History of Poland is a book about history of Poland, written by the English historian Norman Davies. It was published by Oxford University Press in 1984. Second edition with a changed subtitle, Heart of Europe: The Past in Poland's Present, was published in 2001. The book was translated to Polish as Serce Europy. Krótka historia Polski in 1995.

It contains a series of essays by Davies about Polish history. New York Times in 1984 called it "another masterpiece", following his earlier work on Poland.
