= Donny Davies =

English cricketer, footballer, and journalist

Don Davies
Personal information
- Full name: Harry Donald Davies
- Born: 13 March 1892; Manchester, Lancashire, England
- Died: 6 February 1958 (aged 65); Munich-Riem Airport, Germany
- Batting: Right-handed
- Role: Batsman

Domestic team information
- Years: Team
- 1924–1925: Lancashire
- FC debut: 28 May 1924 Lancashire v Kent
- Last FC: 29 August 1925 Lancashire v Kent

Career statistics
Competition	First-class
Matches	11
Runs scored	260
Batting average	17.33
100s/50s	0/0
Top score	46
Catches/stumpings	4/–
- Source: CricketArchive, 8 October 2022

Harry Donald Davies (13 March 1892 – 6 February 1958) was an English first-class cricketer, amateur footballer and journalist. He was killed in the Munich air disaster. He was an uncle to historian Norman Davies.

== Sporting career ==
A talented footballer in his youth, Davies played as a right-winger for the Northern Nomads F.C. and Port Vale. He was capped three times for the England national amateur football team in 1914, with tours of Austria, Hungary and Romania. Also in 1914, he was offered a professional contract with Stoke City. As war broke out, he decided to join the Royal Flying Corps. Just a fortnight after receiving his wings, Davies was shot down over the French town of Douai, captured, and placed in a German Prisoner of War camp. When he eventually returned to England, he weighed only 6 stone (84 lb; 38 kg) and army doctors had given him no more than six months to live.

Davies recovered from his ordeal and took up sport again, playing cricket for Bradshaw in the Bolton League. He was lured to Lancashire and spent the 1924 and 1925 seasons there as an amateur. He appeared in 11 first-class matches as a righthanded batsman, scoring 260 runs with a highest score of 46, and held four catches. Davies made his highest score of 46 in his debut innings against Kent at Old Trafford before being dismissed by Test bowler Tich Freeman.

== Journalist career ==
In 1932, having begun his journalism career two years earlier, Davies was given a job with The Manchester Guardian newspaper and was their football reporter under the name "An Old International". He also did some work on the radio for the BBC. Davies served as a member of the Lancashire committee from 1930 to 1956 and, in 1957, just before his death, was appointed vice-president. Davies was considered to be one of the finest writers in the game of football. His reporting on the Manchester United team was so in-depth that the general public who read/listened to his reporting felt like they were connected to the team. Neville Cardus, who was a cricket correspondent and chief music critic for The Manchester Guardian, described Davies' as "the first writer on soccer to rise above the immediate and quickly perishable of his themes and give us something to preserve. Old International was not only the best of soccer reporters; he was also something of a poet."

== Death ==
On 6 February 1958, a plane carrying Davies, other journalists and the Manchester United squad crashed on takeoff from Munich-Riem Airport in Germany. Davies, who had spent the 1950s covering Manchester United's footballing exploits, was killed along with 22 others. They had been returning from a European Cup tie in Belgrade. John Arlott, who had covered Manchester United's game at Highbury a week earlier, was originally meant to take Davies' spot on the trip to Belgrade as the 'Old International' was unavailable. Davies, however, expressed a desire to attend the trip at the last moment and replaced Arlott. He was 65 at the time of his death and was the oldest victim of the tragedy.
