= Trail of Hope =

2015 book by Norman Davies

Trail of Hope: The Anders Army, An Odyssey across Three Continents
- Author: Norman Davies
- Publisher: Osprey Publishing
- Publication date: 2015
- Pages: 597
- ISBN: 147281603X
- OCLC: 930775456

Trail of Hope: The Anders Army, An Odyssey across Three Continents is a history book about the World War II-era Polish Anders Army, written by the English historian Norman Davies. It was published by Osprey Publishing in 2015. The book was published in English and Polish same year.
