= Reich Chamber of Culture =

Government agency in Nazi Germany

- Reichskulturkammer

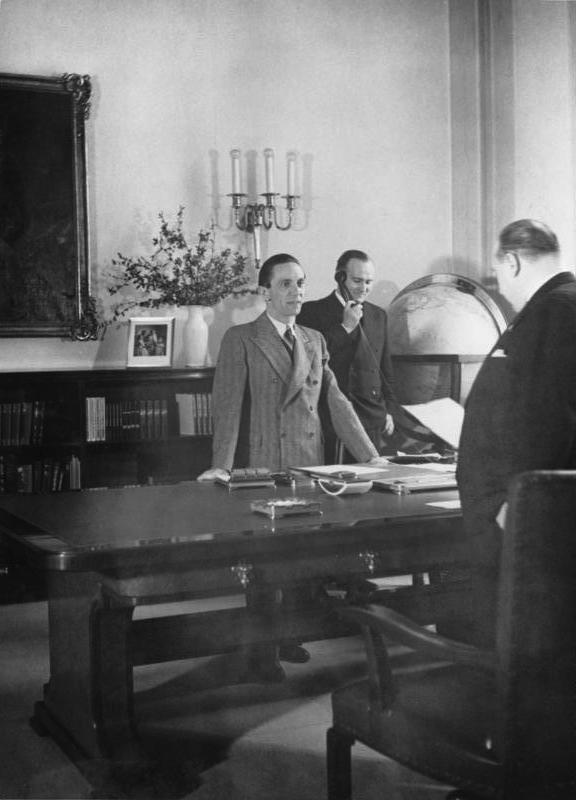
- Minister Goebbels and Walther Funk, at the Reich Ministry of Propaganda. Referent des Ministers Karl Hanke is in the background (1937).

Agency overview
- Formed: 22 September 1933
- Dissolved: 8 May 1945
- Jurisdiction: Nazi Germany
- Headquarters: Wilhelmplatz, Berlin
- Minister responsible: Joseph Goebbels, Reich Minister of Propaganda
- Agency executive: See list, Vice president

The Reich Chamber of Culture (German: Reichskulturkammer, abbreviated as RKK) was a government agency in Nazi Germany. It was established by law on 22 September 1933 in the course of the Gleichschaltung process at the instigation of Reich Minister Joseph Goebbels as a professional organization of all German creative artists. Defying the competing ambitions of the German Labour Front (DAF) under Goebbels' rival Robert Ley, it was meant to gain control over the entire cultural life in Germany creating and promoting Aryan art consistent with Nazi ideals.

Every artist had to apply for membership on presentation of an Aryan certificate. A rejected inscription de facto resulted in an occupational ban.

== Structure and organisation ==
The RKK was affiliated with the Reich Ministry of Public Enlightenment and Propaganda with its seat on Wilhelmplatz in Berlin. Headed by Goebbels himself, a state secretary of his ministry served as vice president:

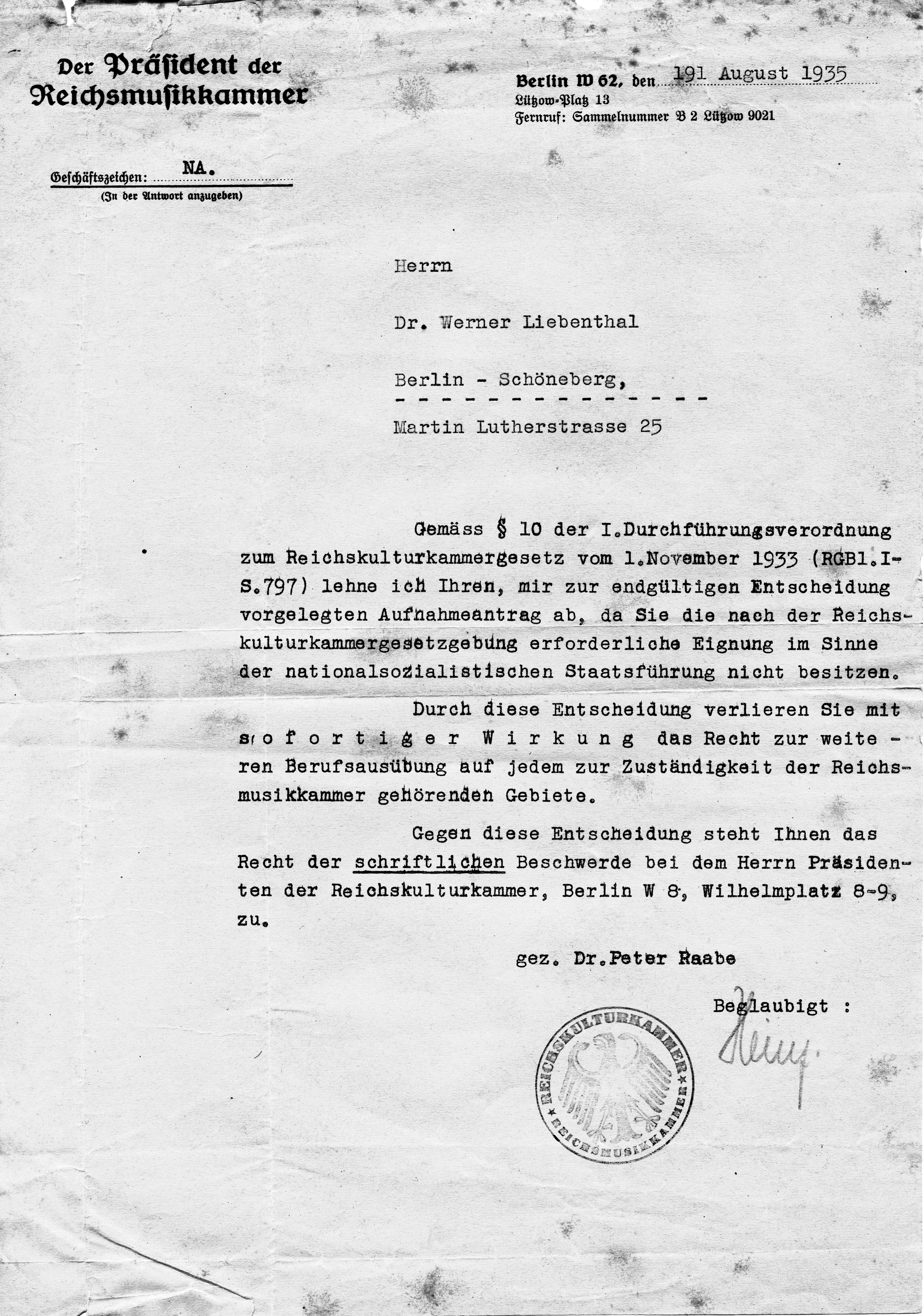
The 1935 Reich Chamber of Music decree to the Berlin musician Werner Liebenthal dictating the immediate cessation of his professional activity

- Walther Funk (1933–1938)
- Karl Hanke (1938–1941)
- Leopold Gutterer (1941–1944)
- Werner Naumann (1944–1945)

SS officer Hans Hinkel was one of the officers in charge of the chamber and Goebbels' special commissioner for the removal of Jews from German cultural life.

Different subdivisions of the RKK dealt with film, music, visual arts, theatre, literature, media, and radio, organized in seven departments:

- Reichsfilmkammer, headed by Carl Froelich from 1939
- Reichsmusikkammer, headed by Richard Strauss, from 1935 by Peter Raabe
- Reichskammer der bildenden Künste ("Reich Chamber of Fine Arts") (de), headed by Eugen Hönig from 1933, by Adolf Ziegler from 1936, and by Wilhelm Kreis from 1943
- Reichstheaterkammer, headed by Rainer Schlösser 1935–1938, by Paul Hartmann from 1942
- Reichsschrifttumskammer, headed by Hans-Friedrich Blunck, from 1935 by Hanns Johst
- Reichspressekammer, headed by Max Amann
- Reichsrundfunkkammer (tasks assigned to Reichs-Rundfunk-Gesellschaft in 1939)

== History ==
Nazi authorities established the RKK to further control public expression and performance.

The RKK initially permitted Jews, but Nazi authorities purged Jews from the RKK in mid-1935.

After the March 1938 German annexation of Austria, the RKK extended its cultural control to Austria.

The RKK was ultimately dissolved and its assets confiscated by Law no. 2 (October 10, 1945) of the Allied Control Council. Footage and archives material are kept by the German Federal Archives (Bundesarchiv) and the Berlin Document Center.

== Degenerate art ==
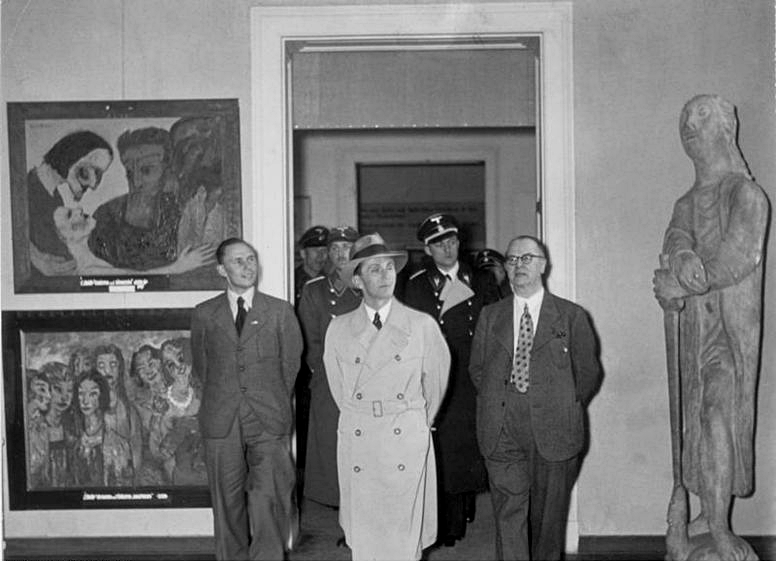
Goebbels visits the 1938 Entartete Kunst exhibition in Munich

The RKK played a significant role in the Nazi oppression of Modern art, defamed as "Cultural Bolshevism". One notable project of the Bildende Künste (Fine Arts) division under Adolf Ziegler was the Entartete Kunst exhibition, of works deemed "degenerate." Opened in July 1937 at the Hofgarten in Munich, touring exhibitions were held from 1938 to 1941 in several major German cities such as Berlin, Leipzig, Düsseldorf, Salzburg, and Hamburg. Attendance was measured in the millions (perhaps largely because entrance was free), and the so-called degenerate art may have been more popular with the public than the Nazis anticipated. Goebbels had supported German expressionists until Hitler intervened and expressed his disgust at artists such as Max Liebermann and Emil Nolde. To raise cash for the Nazi war effort, certain art dealers were authorised to emigrate to New York to sell the art.

== See also ==
- Art in Nazi Germany
- Haus der Kunst
- Curt Valentin
