= God's Playground =

History book by Norman Davies

- Author: Norman Davies
- Language: English
- Subject: History of Poland
- Publisher: Columbia University Press
- Publication date: 1981
- Publication place: United Kingdom
- OCLC: 416195288

God's Playground: A History of Poland is a history book in two volumes written by Norman Davies, covering a 1000-year history of Poland. Volume 1: The origins to 1795, and Volume 2: 1795 to the present first appeared as the Oxford Clarendon Press publication in 1981 and have since been reprinted multiple times, and translated into Polish as Boże igrzysko: Historia Polski by Elżbieta Tabakowska (2 volumes in 1, with 1183 pages by Znak Publishers of Kraków). Davies was inspired to the title by Jan Kochanowski's 1580s poem Boże igrzysko ("Mankind: Bauble of the Gods").

The book, which most editions split into two volumes, has received favourable reviews in the international press, and is considered by many historians and other scholars to be one of the best English-language books on the subject of the history of Poland. The author was decorated with the Order of the White Eagle, Poland's highest civilian award.

== Selected editions ==
English

- God's Playground, Columbia University Press, 1979
- God's Playground, Oxford University Press, 1981, ISBN 0-19-822555-5 (vol. 1), ISBN 0-19-822592-X (vol. 2)
- God's Playground, Columbia University Press, 1982, ISBN 0-231-05350-9 (vol. 1) and ISBN 0-231-05352-5 (vol. 2)
- God's Playground, Columbia University Press, 1983
- God's Playground, Oxford University Press, 1983, ISBN 0-19-821944-X (vol. 2)
- God's Playground, Columbia University Press, 1984, ISBN 0-231-05351-7 (vol.1), ISBN 0-231-05353-3 (vol. 2)
- God's Playground, Oxford University Press, 2005, ISBN 0-19-925339-0 (vol. 1) and ISBN 0-19-925340-4 (vol. 2)
- God's Playground, Columbia University Press, 2005, ISBN 0-231-12817-7 (vol. 1), ISBN 0-231-12819-3 (vol. 2)

Polish

- Boże igrzysko, bibuła edition in the 1980s
- Boże igrzysko, ZNAK 1989, ISBN 83-7006-052-8
- Boże igrzysko, ZNAK 1994, ISBN 83-7006-331-4
- Boże igrzysko, ZNAK 1999
- Boże igrzysko, ZNAK 2006, ISBN 83-240-0654-0
