= Norman Davies =

British historian (born 1939)

Norman Davies CMG, FBA, FRHistS
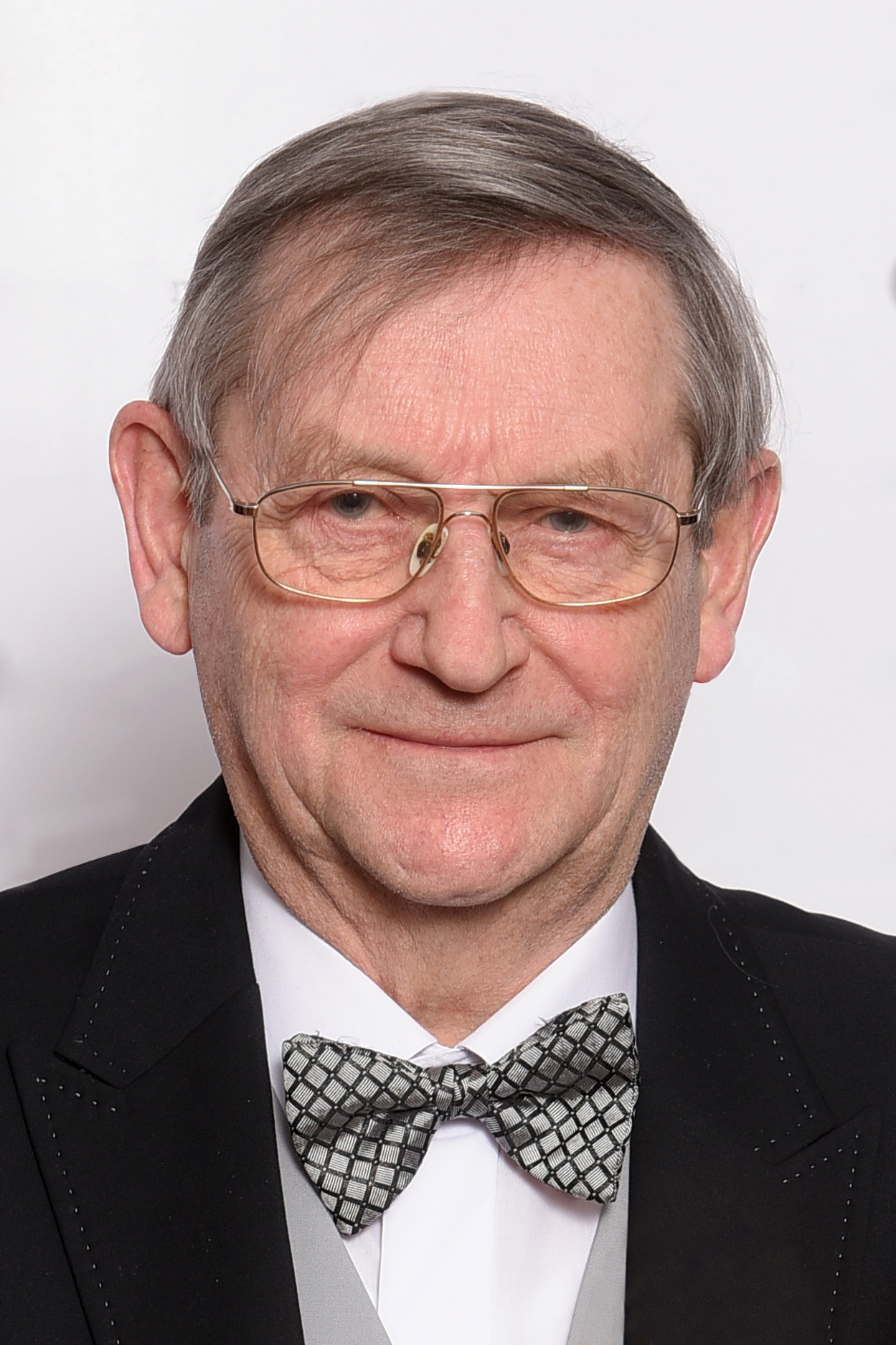
- Davies in 2018
- Born: Ivor Norman Richard Davies; 8 June 1939 (age 87); Bolton, Lancashire, England
- Citizenship: British; Polish
- Spouses: Maria Zielińska (m. 1966); Maria Korzeniewicz (m. 1984)
- Children: 2
- Relatives: Donny Davies (uncle)

Academic background
- Education: Magdalen College, Oxford (BA); University of Sussex (MA); Jagiellonian University (PhD)

Academic work
- Discipline: Historian
- Institutions: School of Slavonic and East European Studies; Wolfson College, Oxford
- Main interests: History of Poland

Ivor Norman Richard Davies (born 8 June 1939) is a British and Polish historian, known for his publications on the history of Europe, Poland and the United Kingdom. He has a special interest in Central and Eastern Europe and is UNESCO Professor at the Jagiellonian University, professor emeritus at University College London, a visiting professor at the Collège d'Europe, and an honorary fellow at St Antony's College, Oxford. He was granted Polish citizenship in 2014.

== Academic career ==
Davies was born to Richard and Elizabeth Davies in Bolton, Lancashire. He is of Welsh descent. He studied in Grenoble, France, from 1957 to 1958 and then under A. J. P. Taylor at Magdalen College, Oxford, where he earned a BA in history in 1962. He was awarded an MA at the University of Sussex in 1966 and also studied in Perugia, Italy. Davies intended to study for a PhD in the Soviet Union but was denied an entry visa, so he went to Kraków, Poland, instead. Davies studied at the Jagiellonian University and did research on the Polish–Soviet War. As this war was denied in the official communist Polish historiography of that time, he was obliged to change the title of his dissertation to The British Foreign Policy towards Poland, 1919–20. After he obtained his PhD in Kraków in 1968, the English text was published in 1972 under the title White Eagle, Red Star: The Polish–Soviet War 1919–20.

From 1971, Davies taught Polish history at the School of Slavonic and East European Studies, where he was professor from 1985 to 1996, when he retired. He subsequently became Supernumerary Fellow at Wolfson College, Oxford, from 1997 to 2006. Throughout his career, Davies has lectured in many countries, including the United States, Canada, Australia, Japan, China, Poland and in most of the rest of Europe as well.

Stanford University's history department denied Davies a tenured faculty position in 1986 (on an 11 against, 10 for and 1 abstaining, vote). The decision was described as "the closest, most acrimonious tenure decision of recent years". After failing to arrange a formal review hearing of the decision, Davies filed a lawsuit against History Professor Harold Kahn and 29 other Stanford professors. This case was dismissed when Davies was unable to depose Kahn. Davies subsequently sought to obtain $3 million in damages from the university, arguing he had been the victim of discrimination on the grounds of his political views (with the claim being "defamation," "breach of contract" and "tortious interference" with a business). The court ruled that because of California's right of privacy "even if we assume that... a candidate may be denied tenure for improper" [e.g., defamatory] "reasons, we are of the opinion that the right of a faculty member to discuss with his colleagues the candidate's qualifications thoroughly and candidly, in confidence and without fear of compelled disclosure, is of such paramount value that it ought not to be impaired." The court upheld the university's right to decide on faculty appointments on the basis of any criteria.

Davies is a visiting professor at the Collège d'Europe.

== Work ==
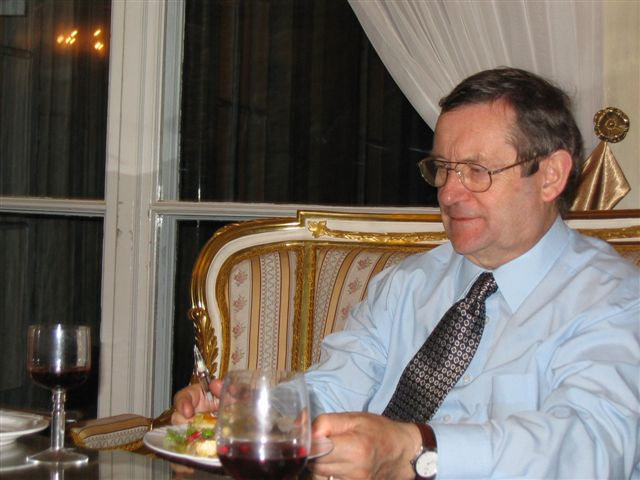
Davies, Warsaw, 2004

Davies' first book, White Eagle, Red Star: The Polish-Soviet War, 1919–20 was published in 1972.

His 1981 book God's Playground, a comprehensive overview of Polish history, was published officially in Poland only after the fall of communism. In 1984, Davies published Heart of Europe, a briefer, more essay-like history of Poland, in which the chapters are arranged in reverse chronological order.

In the 1990s, Davies published Europe: A History (1996) and The Isles: A History (1999), about Europe and the islands of Great Britain and Ireland, respectively. Each book is a narrative interlarded with numerous sidepanel discussions of microtopics.

In 2000, Davies' Polish publishers Znak published a collection of his essays and articles under the title Smok wawelski nad Tamizą ("The Wawel Dragon on the Thames").

In 2002, at the suggestion of the city's mayor, Bogdan Zdrojewski, Davies and his former research assistant, Roger Moorhouse, co-wrote a history of Wrocław / Breslau, a Silesian city. Titled Microcosm: Portrait of a Central European City, the book was published simultaneously in English, Polish and German, and was later translated into Czech, French and Italian.

Davies also writes essays and articles for the mass media. Among others, he has worked for the BBC as well as British and American magazines and newspapers, such as The Times, The New York Review of Books and The Independent. In Poland, his articles appeared in the liberal Catholic weekly Tygodnik Powszechny.

Davies' book Rising '44. The Battle for Warsaw describes the Warsaw Uprising. It was followed by Europe at War 1939–1945: No Simple Victory (2006). In 2008 Davies participated in the documentary film The Soviet Story.

In 2017, Davies published Beneath Another Sky, a travelogue based on a global circumnavigation. In a chapter on aviation, he asserts that Malaysia Airlines Flight 370 was hacked remotely and may have been flown to Antarctica.

== Awards and distinctions ==
Davies holds a number of honorary titles and memberships, including honorary doctorates from the universities of the Jagiellonian University (since 2003), Lublin, Gdańsk and Warsaw (since 2007), memberships in the Polish Academy of Learning (PAU), the Academia Scientiarum et Artium Europaea, and the International Honorary Council of the European Academy of Diplomacy, and fellowships of the British Academy, the Royal Historical Society and the Royal Society of Literature.

Davies received an honorary DLitt degree from his alma mater the University of Sussex. Davies is also an honorary citizen of Polish cities of Warsaw, Wrocław, Lublin, and Kraków, and a member of the committee for the Order of the Smile.

Edward Bernard Raczyński, President of the Polish government-in-exile, decorated Davies with the Order of Polonia Restituta. On 22 December 1998 President of Poland Aleksander Kwaśniewski awarded him the Grand Cross (1st class) of the Order of Merit of the Republic of Poland. Finally, on 11 November 2012, Davies was decorated with the Order of the White Eagle, Poland's highest civilian award.

In 2001, Davies was made a companion of the Order of Saint Michael and Saint George for service to Central European history.

Davies has been appointed to the advisory board of the European Association of History Educators—EUROCLIO. In 2008, he was awarded the Order of the Cross of St Mary's Land 3rd Class by the Republic of Estonia.

Davies also received Knight of Freedom Award in 2006 for his promotion of Polish history and the values represented by General Casimir Pulaski.

In 2012, he received the Aleksander Gieysztor Prize for his promotion of Polish cultural heritage abroad.

In 2019 he was accepted by Swedish Academy to the list of literature Nobel Prize candidates. The information was announced during author's meeting in Gniezno, Poland.

== Political views ==
Davies disagrees with the historical policy of the Law and Justice party. He stated in 2017 that "PiS wants to politicize history to a degree unseen in the last 25 years".

Davies himself argues that "Holocaust scholars need have no fears that rational comparisons might threaten that uniqueness. Quite the opposite." and that "one needs to re-construct mentally the fuller picture in order to comprehend the true enormity of Poland's wartime cataclysm, and then to say with absolute conviction 'Never Again'."

== Personal life ==
Davies married Maria Korzeniewicz, a Polish scholar born in Dąbrowa Tarnowska. He lives in Oxford and Kraków, and has two sons. His uncle Donny died in the Munich air disaster.

Davies was initially a member of the Congregational Church in Bolton, but converted to Roman Catholicism. His mother was a devout Christian and a nonconformist Protestant. In an interview for Aleteia in 2018, Davies stated that he converted to Roman Catholicism in Poland and believed in divine providence based on the doctrine of providence of St Augustine. He also expressed his respect for the Ukrainian Orthodox Church and once attended the Ukrainian Orthodox liturgy. Polish journalist Jan Wróbel called Davies a "liberal Catholic and open-minded patriot".

== Books ==
- 1972: White Eagle, Red Star: The Polish–Soviet War, 1919–20. (2004 edition: ISBN 0-7126-0694-7)
- 1977: Poland, Past and Present: A Select Bibliography of Works in English. ISBN 0-89250-011-5
- 1981: God's Playground: A History of Poland. Vol. 1: The Origins to 1795, Vol. 2: 1795 to the Present. Oxford: Oxford University Press. ISBN 0-19-925339-0 / ISBN 0-19-925340-4
- 1984: Heart of Europe: A Short History of Poland. Oxford: Oxford University Press. ISBN 0-19-285152-7
  - 2001: Heart of Europe: The Past in Poland's Present. Oxford University Press, USA; new edition ISBN 0-19-280126-0
- 1991: Jews in Eastern Poland and the USSR, 1939–46. Palgrave Macmillan. ISBN 0-312-06200-1
- 1996: Europe: A History. Oxford: Oxford University Press. ISBN 0-19-820171-0
- 1997: Auschwitz and the Second World War in Poland: A lecture given at the Representations of Auschwitz international conference at the Jagiellonian University. Universitas. ISBN 83-7052-935-6
- 1999: Red Winds from the North. Able Publishing. ISBN 0-907616-45-3
- 1999: The Isles: A History. Oxford: Oxford University Press. ISBN 0-19-513442-7
- 2002 (with Roger Moorhouse): Microcosm: Portrait of a Central European City London: Jonathan Cape. ISBN 0-224-06243-3
- 2004: Rising '44: The Battle for Warsaw. London: Pan Books. ISBN 0-333-90568-7
- 2006: Europe East and West: A Collection of Essays on European History. Jonathan Cape. ISBN 0-224-06924-1
- 2006: Europe at War 1939–1945: No Simple Victory. Macmillan. ISBN 0-333-69285-3
- 2008: To and From. Modern Poland: A Journey Through Postal History. Rosikon Press. ISBN 978-83-88848-64-3
- 2011: Vanished Kingdoms: The History of Half-Forgotten Europe. Allen Lane. ISBN 978-1-84614-338-0
- 2015: Trail of Hope: The Anders Army, An Odyssey across Three Continents. Osprey Publishing. ISBN 978-1-47281-603-0
- 2017: Beneath Another Sky: A Global Journey into History. Allen Lane ISBN 978-1-84614-831-6
