= Rising '44 =

Book by Norman Davies

Rising '44: The Battle for Warsaw
- Author: Norman Davies
- Language: English
- Subject: Warsaw Uprising
- Publisher: Macmillan
- Publication date: 2003
- Publication place: United States

Rising '44: The Battle for Warsaw is the title of a documented and illustrated historical account of the Warsaw Uprising by the historian Norman Davies. It was mostly well received by specialists and commentators during its publication.

One controversy surrounding the book is that Davies purposely anglicised most of the Polish proper names, including placenames and pseudonyms used by Polish conspirators, to bring the reality of events closer to English-speaking readers and to help them concentrate on the narrative, rather than on the complexity of Polish names.

However, the Polish historian Jan Ciechanowski has taken grave exception to the work in more general terms:

In the hands of Davies the Warsaw Rising has become his personal "plaything", the outpouring of his uncommonly overactive imagination, his huge arrogance and of his vast fantasy. In fact his knowledge about the Warsaw Rising is actually limited.

Ciechanowski has accused the author of so littering the book with factual and interpretative errors, "the number of all manner of errors in Davies' work is such, as to render his account of the Rising not wholly credible".
