= Europe: A History =

1996 book by Norman Davies

- Cover of the first edition
- Author: Norman Davies
- Language: English
- Subject: History of Europe
- Published: 1996
- Media type: Print
- ISBN: 978-0060974688

Europe: A History is a 1996 narrative history book by Norman Davies.

== Contents ==
As Davies notes in the preface, the book contains little that is original. Primary research was rarely required. Twelve chapters span European history from prehistory to the Dissolution of the Soviet Union. The chapters contain almost 300 so-called "capsules", texts describing separate terms that often exceed the specific time frame (such as Coward, Hatred, Loot or Vorkuta). In the middle, Davies tries to avoid what he calls the bias of "Western Civilization" (the neglect of Eastern Europe), and in the 20th century, he fights the "Allied scheme of history". Davies notes at the end of the preface that the book is "only one from an almost infinite number of histories of Europe that could be written" and that his work is "the view of one pair of eyes".

== Reception ==
The book was on bestseller lists in London for several months but received a famous scathing review in The New York Times by Theodore K. Rabb.

In the book, Davies criticises, often in strong language, previous historians and alleges that they have promulgated cliches, which he calls "the Allied Scheme of History". Anne Applebaum, in her review, asserts that may be a cause of equally-acrimonious criticism of the book by some peers.

A good deal of criticism was caused by Davies's drawing a parallel between atrocities carried out by Germans during the Holocaust, as exemplified by the case of Battalion 101 in Otwock, and Jewish postwar co-operation, with Communist atrocities, accusing him of equating both and thus of downgrading the uniqueness of the Holocaust. Davies rebutted that he had not equated but only juxtaposed them to invite comparison. Applebaum supports Davies in that respect and writes that she understands that as an example how ordinary people of any background may behave badly under certain circumstances.

Davies's treatment of the political repression in the Soviet Union in the book has been disputed by the historian Stephen G. Wheatcroft of the University of Melbourne. Particularly, Wheatcroft claims that Davies made a series of misleading statements that greatly exaggerated the scale of Stalinist repression far beyond the estimates of Robert Conquest that Wheatcroft also considers exaggerated. Further, Davies mocked "semi-repentant 'revisionists'", but Wheatcroft argues that Davies erroneously claims that "the highest estimates have been vindicated" since the collapse of the Soviet Union. Wheatcroft asserts that the exact opposite is true and that the "view of the 'revisionists' has been largely substantiated" by the new data from the opened Soviet archives, as opposed to hearsay and journalism data Conquest and Davies were basing upon.

In this book, Norman Davies argued that “10 millions or more people died in Russia Civil War”, which was controversial.

== Editions ==
- Europe: A History. Oxford: Oxford University Press 1996. ISBN 0-19-820171-0
- Europe: A History. New York: HarperCollins 1998, corrected edition. ISBN 0-06-097468-0
