= Otto Dietrich =

German Nazi Reich Press Chief and SS-Obergruppenführer (1897–1952)

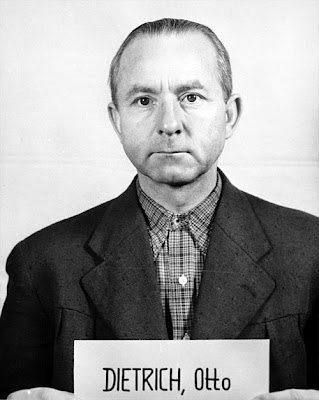

Nazi Party Press Chief
- In office 1 August 1931 – 30 March 1945

Reichsleiter
- In office 2 June 1933 – 30 March 1945

Vice-President of the Reich Press Chamber
- In office 15 November 1933 – 30 March 1945
- President: Max Amann

Reich Press Chief and State Secretary in the Ministry of Public Enlightenment and Propaganda
- In office 26 November 1937 – 30 March 1945
- Preceded by: Walther Funk
- Succeeded by: Position abolished

Personal details
- Born: Jacob Otto Dietrich; 31 August 1897 Bruchsal, German Empire
- Died: 22 November 1952 (aged 55) Düsseldorf, West Germany
- Party: Nazi Party

Military service
- Rank: SS-Obergruppenfüher

Jacob Otto Dietrich (31 August 1897 – 22 November 1952) was a German Schutzstaffel (SS) officer during the Nazi era, who served as the Press Chief of the Nazi regime and was a confidant of Adolf Hitler.

== Biography ==
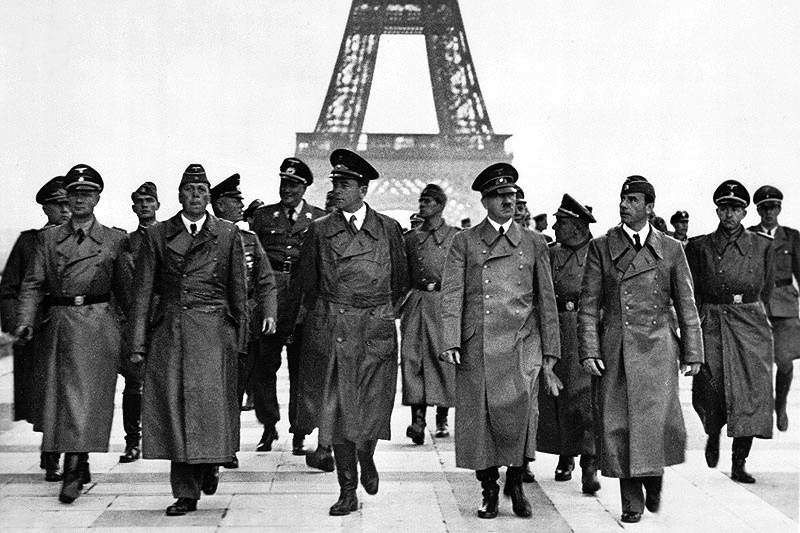
Hitler visits Paris in 1940 with Dietrich

Otto Dietrich was born in Essen, he served as a soldier during World War I and was awarded the Iron Cross (First Class). Afterwards he studied at the universities of Munich, Frankfurt am Main and Freiburg, from which he graduated with a doctorate in political science in 1921.

Dietrich worked for newspapers in Essen and Munich. In 1929 he became a member of the Nazi Party (NSDAP) as a Personal Press Referent. Here he was able to introduce Hitler to numerous important officials within different sects of the mining industry to help secure funding for the Nazi Party. On 1 August 1931 he was appointed Press Chief of the NSDAP, and the following year joined the SS. On 2 June 1933 Hitler appointed Dietrich a Reichsleiter, the second highest political rank in the Nazi Party. On 1 November, he was named Vice-President of the Reich Press Chamber (Reichspressekammer) under Max Amann. On February 28, 1934, Hitler raised Dietrich to the position of Reich Press Chief of the Nazi Party. In March 1936, he was elected as a Nazi deputy of the Reichstag from electoral constituency 29, Leipzig, and retained this seat until the collapse of the Nazi regime. On 26 November 1937, Dietrich became the Reich Press Chief of the Government and a State Secretary in the Reich Ministry of Public Enlightenment and Propaganda. On April 20, 1941 he had risen to the rank of SS-Obergruppenführer.

In the decree from Hitler on February 28, 1934 the role of the Reich Press Chief was loosely explained: "He directs in my name the guiding principles for the entire editorial work of the Party Press. In addition, as my Press Chief he is the highest authority for all press publications of the Party and all its agencies." Dietrich, as the Press Chief of the Nazi Party and later as the Reich Press Chief of the Government, had control over the Nazi party's publications and newspapers. This included anything disseminated to the SS, SA, Hitler Youth, and the German Labor Front. The work done by Dietrich helped to secure the Nazis foothold in Germany. He aided party members to acquire positions of power and general acceptance within different communities and helped to spread Nazi ideology to the public.

His job as Press Chief overlapped with Joseph Goebbels's Ministry of Public Enlightenment and Propaganda, and thus many anecdotes exist of their feuds. They were infamous for their disagreements, and both often felt obliged to "repair" the mistakes of the other. Dietrich believed himself to be the supreme commander over the German press and so sought to lessen Goebbels's influence within the Press Department.

Dietrich had a close relationship with Hitler. In some testimony from Hans Fritzsche, the head of the German Press Division from December 1938 to November 1942, who worked under Dietrich, he noted that: "For years he (Dietrich) also summarized the press telegrams, which constituted one of the most important sources of information for Hitler. Finally I could see for myself that he elaborated Hitler's speeches for publication. Thus Dr. Dietrich also functioned as the transmitter of Hitler's current directives to Dr. Goebbels." However, in the secrecy mandated by war, Dietrich, who was not in Hitler's "inner circle," often did not truly know of Hitler's whereabouts.

Dietrich retained the confidence of the Führer throughout the regime until Hitler accused him of defeatism and placed him on indefinite leave after an argument on 30 March 1945. After the war ended, he was arrested by the British. In 1949, he was tried at the subsequent Nuremberg trials, where he was convicted of crimes against humanity and being a member of a criminal organization, namely the SS, and was sentenced to seven years' imprisonment. Dietrich's conviction for crimes against humanity stemmed from anti-Semitic propaganda which he broadcast.

"These press and periodical directives were not mere political polemics, they were not aimless expressions of anti-Semitism, and they were not designed only to unite the German people in the war effort."

"Their clear and expressed purpose was to enrage Germans against the Jews, to justify the measures taken and to be taken against them, and to subdue any doubts which might arise as to the justice of measures of racial persecution to which Jews were to be subjected."

"By them Dietrich consciously implemented, and by furnishing the excuses and justifications, participated in, the crimes against humanity regarding Jews charged in count five."

Dietrich was released from prison in August 1950. He died of natural causes in November 1952 in Düsseldorf.

== Memoir: The Hitler I Knew ==
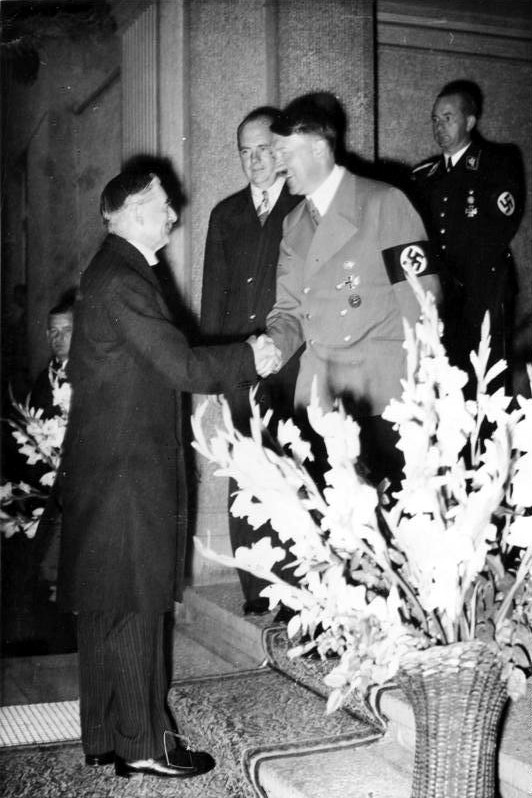
Hitler receives British PM Neville Chamberlain (September 1938). Dietrich is on the right, behind Hitler

In captivity in Landsberg Prison, Dietrich wrote The Hitler I Knew. Memoirs of the Third Reich's Press Chief, a book sharply critical of Hitler personally and strongly denouncing the crimes committed in the name of Nazism. The first part of the book contains assessments by Dietrich about his character, his reflections on Hitler as a politician and as a soldier, and his critique of his leadership. The second part (Scenes from Hitler's Life) describes Dietrich's first-hand oberservations of Hitler's daily activities before and during the war. The book, translated by Richard and Clara Winston, was published by Methuen in 1957, and republished in 2010 by Skyhorse Publishing, with a new introduction by historian Roger Moorhouse.

== Publications ==
- Dietrich O. The Hitler I Knew. Memoirs of the Third Reich's Press Chief. Skyhorse Publishing, 2010. ISBN 978-1602399723
