= Richard Butterwick =

British historian

Richard Butterwick-Pawlikowski
- Born: Richard Butterwick; 1968 (age 57–58); Hitchin, England
- Occupation: Historian
- Known for: Polish history, Polish-Lithuanian Commonwealth studies
- Spouse: Wioletta Pawlikowska
- Awards: Bronze medal, Gloria Artis (2016)

Academic background
- Education: BA (Hons) in History (University of Cambridge); MA (University of Cambridge); DPhil. (University of Oxford)
- Alma mater: University of Oxford
- Doctoral advisor: R. J. W. Evans

Academic work
- Discipline: History
- Sub-discipline: Polish history; Lithuanian history; History of the Polish-Lithuanian Commonwealth; 18th-century European history
- Institutions: School of Slavonic and East European Studies (University College London); University of Warsaw
- Notable works: Poland's Last King and English Culture; The Polish Revolution and the Catholic Church; The Constitution of 3 May 1791
- Website: Richard Butterwick-Pawlikowski publications on Academia.edu

Richard Butterwick-Pawlikowski (1968) is Professor of Polish-Lithuanian History at the UCL School of Slavonic and East European Studies (SSEES).

== Biography ==
Butterwick studied history at the University of Cambridge, graduating with first class honours in 1989, and gained his doctorate from the University of Oxford in 1994. In 1993–94 taught at the University of Łódź, then held a three-year postdoctoral fellowship at Oxford. He became a lecturer in Modern European History at the Queen's University of Belfast in 1997. Having joined SSEES in 2005, he became a professor in 2013.

His book The Polish-Lithuanian Commonwealth 1733-1795: Light and Flame won the Polish Institute of Arts and Sciences of America's Oskar Halecki Award in 2021 and the Polish Historical Society's Pro Historia Polonorum prize in 2022. The Polish edition is longer.

Butterwick was awarded the bronze medal Gloria Artis for his services to Polish culture in 2016. In March 2022, he became principal historian of the Polish History Museum in Warsaw. In 2024, he was appointed professor of the humanities by the president of the Republic of Poland.

=== Personal life ===
He married Wioletta Pawlikowska in Poland in 2012.

== Books ==
- Poland's Last King and English Culture: Stanisław August Poniatowski, 1732-1798 (Oxford: OUP, 1998, ISBN 978-0198207016)
- The Polish Revolution and the Catholic Church, 1788-1792: A Political History (Oxford: OUP, 2012, ISBN 978-0199250332; longer Polish edition)
- The Polish-Lithuanian Commonwealth, 1733–1795 (Yale University Press, 2020, ISBN 978-0300252200)
- The Constitution of 3 May 1791: Testament of the Polish-Lithuanian Commonwealth (Warsaw: Polish History Museum, 2021, Link)
- Lithuania: A Short History (Hurst Publishers, 2025, ISBN 978-1911723608)
