= Ernst Krappe =

German Nazi Party politician

Chairman of the State Presidency Free State of Lippe
- In office 7 February 1933 – 26 May 1933
- Preceded by: Heinrich Drake
- Succeeded by: Hans-Joachim Riecke

Personal details
- Born: 31 October 1891 Soest, Province of Westphalia, Kingdom of Prussia, German Empire
- Died: 12 May 1977 (aged 85) Minden, North Rhine-Westphalia, West Germany
- Party: Nazi Party
- Education: University of Lausanne; Ludwig-Maximilians-Universität München; Humboldt University of Berlin; University of Breslau
- Profession: Lawyer

Military service
- Allegiance: German Empire
- Branch/service: Imperial German Army
- Years of service: 1914–1918
- Unit: Artillery Command 232
- Battles/wars: World War I
- Awards: Iron Cross, 1st and 2nd class

Ernst Krappe (31 October 1891 – 12 May 1977) was a German lawyer, economics expert and Nazi Party politician who served as the chairman of the State Presidency of the Free State of Lippe in 1933.

== Early life ==
Krappe was born in Soest and graduated from the Gymnasium in Minden. He then studied law, political science and economics at the University of Lausanne, the Ludwig-Maximilians-Universität München and the Humboldt University of Berlin. In 1914, he passed the Referendar state examination and began working as an apprentice lawyer. At the outbreak of the First World War, he joined the Imperial German Army in August 1914, first seeing combat with a field artillery unit and then becoming an Ordonnanz (orderly officer) with Artillery Command 232. He served on both the western and eastern fronts, and was awarded the Iron Cross 1st and 2nd class.

After the end of the war, Krappe resumed his legal studies. In 1920, he received a Doctor of Law degree from the University of Breslau (today, the University of Wrocław). Passage of the Assessor examination followed in 1921. Between 1921 and 1929, Krappe worked as an administrative lawyer in the Reich Finance Administration in Minden, Paderborn and Herford. On 1 November 1929, he became a Regierungsrat (government councilor) and was appointed as head of the tax office in Lemgo.

== Nazi Party and political career ==
In 1929, Krappe joined the Nazi Party. In 1931, he became the Gau economics advisor in Gau Westphalia-North based in Münster. The following year, he advanced to the post of Gau Inspector and became a Gauredner (Gau orator) for economic issues. In the July 1932 German federal election, Krappe was elected as a Reichstag deputy for constituency 17 (Westphalia North) but was not returned to office at the subsequent election in November of the same year.

Seeking to reverse the decline in their electoral fortunes from November, the Nazis made a concerted effort to win the next state legislative election, which was scheduled in the Free State of Lippe for 15 January 1933. Monetary and manpower resources were invested in campaign propaganda, with Adolf Hitler himself delivered seventeen speeches there in eleven days. When the election results came in, the Nazis had out-polled all other parties and increased their share of the vote from 34.7% to 39.5%. Krappe secured a seat in the Landtag (state parliament), which on 7 February elected him as chairman of the three-member State Presidency, succeeding the Social Democrat, Heinrich Drake. On 26 May 1933, however, Krappe stepped down from this office at his own request. He was succeeded by Hans-Joachim Riecke. In July 1933, Krappe became an Oberregierungsrat (senior government councilor) at the state tax office in Kassel, rising to the position of office director in July 1934.

Little is known of his subsequent life, and he died in Minden in 1977.

== Written works ==
- Beiträge zur Lehre von der Notverordnung (1920). (Dissertation)

== See also ==
- Free State of Lippe

== Sources ==
- Ernst Krappe Biography in the Reichstag Database
- Ernst Krappe Entry in the Westphalian History internet portal
- Gonschior, Andreas: Der Freistaat Lippe Die Landespräsidien 1918–1933 in Wahlen in der Weimarer Republik
- Longerich, Peter (2019). Hitler: A Biography. Oxford University Press. ISBN 978-0-190-05673-5.
- Stockhorst, Erich (1985). 5000 Köpfe: Wer War Was im 3. Reich. Arndt. ISBN 978-3-887-41116-9.
