= Hans-Joachim Riecke =

German Nazi politician and SS general (1899–1986)

State Secretary Reich Ministry of Food and Agriculture
- In office 1 June 1942 – 23 May 1945
- Chancellor: Adolf Hitler
- Preceded by: Herbert Backe
- Succeeded by: Position abolished

Personal details
- Born: 20 June 1899 Dresden, Kingdom of Saxony, German Empire
- Died: 11 August 1986 (aged 87) Hamburg, West Germany
- Party: Nazi Party
- Education: University of Leipzig
- Occupation: Agronomist
- Known for: Hunger Plan
- Awards: Iron Cross, 1st and 2nd class

Military service
- Allegiance: German Empire
- Branch/service: Imperial German Army; Freikorps
- Years of service: 1914–1919; 1944–1945
- Rank: Leutnant; SS-Gruppenführer
- Battles/wars: World War I

Hans-Joachim Riecke or Hans-Joachim Ernst Riecke (20 June 1899 – 11 August 1986) was a German Nazi politician who served in the Reichstag and rose to the rank of Gruppenführer in both the Sturmabteilung (SA) and the Schutzstaffel (SS). During World War II, Riecke was the State Secretary (Staatssekretär) to Herbert Backe, the Reichsminister of Food and Agriculture. He was Backe's accomplice in planning and implementing the Hunger Plan which resulted in the death by starvation of millions of people in the Soviet Union.

== Early life ==
Riecke was born in Dresden, the son of a Prussian military officer. He attended high schools in Berlin, Schneeberg, Saxony, and Leipzig. He served in the Imperial German Army in the First World War from 1914 to 1918 and was wounded four times. He was awarded the Iron Cross, 1st and 2nd class. In 1917, he was promoted to Leutnant. At the end of the war, Riecke became a member of a Freikorps and, until 1920, served in the Grenzschutz Ost. From 1922 to 1925, he studied agriculture at the Leipzig University and graduated in 1925 with a degree in farming.

== Nazi Party career ==
Riecke joined the Nazi Party in June 1925. From 1925 he worked in the Chamber of Agriculture of Westphalia in Münster, rising to head of the Department of Agriculture. In 1929, he was the leader of the Sturmabteilung (SA) in Münster. From 1931 to 1933, he worked in Gau Westphalia-North as an agricultural advisor and an adjutant to the Gauleiter, Alfred Meyer. After the Nazi seizure of power, he served briefly (1 April – 23 May 1933) as the head of government (as Reichskommissar) of the Free State of Schaumburg-Lippe. From 23 May 1933 to 1 February 1936 he was Minister of State (Staatsminister) of the Free State of Lippe under Meyer who was the Reichsstatthalter (Reich Governor). In March 1933, he was appointed to the Landtag of Prussia and served until its dissolution in October. At the November 1933 parliamentary election, he was elected as a Reichstag deputy from electoral constituency 17 (Westphalia North) and retained this seat until the fall of the Nazi regime. In 1936 he became a Department Head (Ministerialdirektor) to Herbert Backe in the Reich Ministry of Food and Agriculture.

=== Wartime involvement with the Hunger Plan ===
During World War II he was the most important accomplice of Herbert Backe in developing and administering the Hunger Plan. Riecke headed the agricultural section of the Economic Staff East of the Four Year Plan, whose guidelines appeared on 23 May 1941 and acknowledged that mass starvation would occur among the Slavic civilian populations under German occupation by directing all food supplies to the German home front and the Wehrmacht deployed on the Eastern Front. Riecke simultaneously served as head of the "Chief Group for Agriculture" in the Reich Ministry for the Occupied Eastern Territories to better coordinate agricultural policies in the East. On 1 June 1942, Riecke was named acting State Secretary (Staatssekretär) in the Agriculture Ministry; on 17 July 1944 he became permanent State Secretary. Riecke held the rank of SA-Gruppenführer from 1942. In 1944, he switched from the SA to the SS (SS number 499,307), entering with the rank of SS-Gruppenführer effective 10 October. After Hitler's suicide, Riecke continued in his position in the Flensburg government under Karl Dönitz.

== Postwar life ==
Riecke was arrested on 23 May 1945 and interned at Camp Ashcan in Luxembourg until August 1945. At the Nuremberg trials he testified in April 1946 at the trial of Alfred Rosenberg as a defence witness in favour of the accused. During the Ministries Trial, one of the subsequent Nuremberg Trials, he appeared in February 1948 as a witness for the prosecution against Richard Walther Darré, Backe's predecessor as Reichsminister for Agriculture. He remained interned until March 1949. In denazification proceedings, Riecke was classified as "Group II" (offenders) and on 30 October 1950 was sentenced to 2 years imprisonment but was released on the basis of time served. An appeal was denied on 16 November 1952, but a request for clemency to the state of Hesse resulted in his reclassification as "Group IV" (followers) after payment of a 500 Reichsmark fine, effective 1 July 1954.

From 1952 to 1970 Riecke was an official and head of the Economics Department of the Alfred C. Toepfer Company, which operated, among other areas, in global trade in agricultural products, particularly grain. After that, Riecke was vice executive until 1976 of the Alfred Toepfer Stiftung F.V.S., which also provided substantial financial support to the Toepfer company, and from 1976 to his death in 1986 an honorary member of this Foundation.

== See also ==
- List SS-Gruppenführer

== Sources ==
- Wigbert Benz: Hans-Joachim Riecke, NS-Staatssekretär. Vom Hungerplaner vor, zum "Welternährer" nach 1945. Wissenschaftlicher Verlag Berlin, Berlin 2014, ISBN 978-3-86573-793-9.
- Alex J. Kay: Exploitation, Resettlement, Mass Murder: Political and Economic Planning for German Occupation Policy in the Soviet Union, 1940-1941. (= Studies on War and Genocide, Vol. 10) Berghahn Books, New York, Oxford 2006, ISBN 1-84545-186-4.
- Klee, Ernst (2007). Das Personenlexikon zum Dritten Reich. Wer war was vor und nach 1945. Frankfurt-am-Main: Fischer-Taschenbuch-Verlag. ISBN 978-3-596-16048-8.
