= Peter Stangier =

Nazi German politician and SA general

Deputy Gauleiter Gau Westphalia-North
- In office August 1931 – 8 May 1945
- Preceded by: Position created
- Succeeded by: Position abolished

Personal details
- Born: 7 April 1898 Gevelsberg, Province of Westphalia, Kingdom of Prussia, German Empire
- Died: 12 December 1962 (aged 64) Münster, North Rhine-Westphalia, West Germany
- Party: Nazi Party
- Occupation: Locksmith

Military service
- Allegiance: German Empire
- Branch/service: Imperial German Army
- Years of service: 1918
- Battles/wars: World War I

Peter Heinrich Stangier (7 April 1898 – 12 December 1962) was a German Nazi Party politician and a Gruppenführer of the Sturmabteilung (SA) who served as the Deputy Gauleiter in northern Westphalia from 1931 to 1945.

== Early life ==
Stangier was born in Gevelsberg, a town in the district of Ennepe-Ruhr-Kreis in German's industrial heartland, the Ruhr. After attending volksschule through 1912, Stangier was apprenticed as a locksmith. He was employed by various companies and also attended a technical school for crafts and trades. From January 1918 he took part in the First World War as a member of the Imperial German Army. Around 1921 he moved to Gelsenkirchen, where he took a job as a machinist in the Ewald Colliery. Stangier first joined the Nazi Party in March 1923. Because of his political activism in opposition to the French occupation of the Ruhr, he was expelled from the area in May 1924.

== Nazi Party and SA career ==
Following the lifting of the ban that had been imposed on the Nazi Party in the wake of the Beer Hall Putsch, he rejoined it on 1 August 1925 (membership number 16,676). He became the Ortsgruppenleiter (Local Group Leader) in Resse until 1926 and also returned to help found the Party group in Gelsenkirchen. From 1926 he became active in the Ruhr contingent of the SA, the Party's paramilitary organization. He was the commander of SA-Sturm 67 from 1927 to 1930, then served as a regimental adjutant to 1931, followed by command of SA-Standarte 5. In December 1931, he was made Stabsführer (Staff Leader) for SA-Untergruppe Westphalia-North. After the formation of the Gau Westphalia-North in January 1931, Stangier was selected to be the Deputy Gauleiter to Alfred Meyer in August 1931. He would be the sole holder of this post, serving until the end of the regime in 1945. From 1931 to 1933 he was in charge of personnel matters as the Gauorganisationsleiter (Gau Organization Leader) and he also served as a magistrate in the Gau-level Party disciplinary court (USCHLA). In the April 1932 Prussian state election Stangier was elected to the Landtag of Prussia, serving until its dissolution in October 1933.

After the Nazi seizure of power on 12 March 1933, Stangier was appointed as a City Councillor in Gelsenkirchen and became the Nazi faction leader. He was responsible for police administration and, later, also municipal operations and cultural administration. On 15 September 1933, he was named to the Prussian State Council where he represented Meyer. From November 1933 until the end of the Nazi regime in May 1945, Stangier was a member of the Reichstag as a deputy for electoral constituency 17 (Westphalia North), being reelected in 1936 and 1938. From 1935 on, he was also a Prussian Provincial Councilor for the Province of Westphalia. After the conquest of Poland in the Second World War, Stangier was under consideration for one of the Gauleiter positions to be created in the conquered territory but he lost out to Arthur Greiser. Stangier carried the rank of Befehlsleiter in the Party hierarchy, and he attained the rank of SA-Gruppenführer in the SA on 30 January 1941.

== Post-war denazification ==
On 10 May 1945, Stangier was arrested and interned by Allied forces. On 10 May 1948, despite the prosecutor's recommendation for a four-year sentence, he was sentenced to two years in prison by the denazification tribunal in Recklinghausen due to his membership in the Nazi leadership corps, and was released on the basis of time served. On 2 November of the same year, a request for revision of the judgment was dismissed. Stangier lived in Münster until his death in 1962.

== SA ranks ==
SA Ranks
Date	Rank
1 December 1931	SA-Standartenführer
20 April 1936	SA-Oberführer
30 January 1938	SA-Brigadeführer
30 January 1941	SA-Gruppenführer

== Sources ==
- Lilla, Joachim: Senior administrative officials and officials in Westphalia and Lippe (1918-1945/46). Biographical Handbook. Aschendorff, Münster 2004, ISBN 3-402-06799-4, p. 284f. (Publications of the Historical Commission for Westphalia. 22, A, 16 = Historical work on Westphalian state research. Economic and social history group. 16)
- Joachim Lilla, Martin Döring, Andreas Schulz: Statisten in Uniform: Die Mitglieder des Reichstags 1933–1945. Ein biographisches Handbuch. Unter Einbeziehung der völkischen und nationalsozialistischen Reichstagsabgeordneten ab Mai 1924. Droste, Düsseldorf 2004, ISBN 3-7700-5254-4.
- Lilla, Joachim (2005). Der Preußische Staatsrat 1921–1933: Ein biographisches Handbuch. Düsseldorf: Droste Verlag. ISBN 978-3-770-05271-4.
- Miller, Michael D.; Schulz, Andreas (2012). Gauleiter: The Regional Leaders of the Nazi Party and Their Deputies, 1925–1945. Vol. 1 (Herbert Albrecht - H. Wilhelm Hüttmann). R. James Bender Publishing. ISBN 978-1-932-97021-0.
- Orlow, Dietrich (1973). The History of the Nazi Party: 1933–1945. University of Pittsburgh Press. ISBN 0-822-9-3253-9.
