= Alfred Meyer =

German Nazi official (1891–1945)

- Meyer in 1941

Deputy Reichsminister for the Occupied Eastern Territories
- In office 17 July 1941 – 11 April 1945
- Leader: Alfred Rosenberg

Oberpräsident of the Province of Westphalia
- In office 4 November 1938 – 11 April 1945
- Preceded by: Ferdinand von Lüninck
- Succeeded by: Position abolished

Minister of State of the Free State of Lippe
- In office 1 February 1936 – 11 April 1945
- Preceded by: Hans-Joachim Riecke
- Succeeded by: Heinrich Drake

Reichsstatthalter of the Free State of Lippe
- In office 16 May 1933 – 11 April 1945

Reichsstatthalter of the Free State of Schaumburg-Lippe
- In office 16 May 1933 – 11 April 1945

Gauleiter of the Gau of North Westphalia
- In office 31 January 1931 – 11 April 1945

Personal details
- Born: Gustav Alfred Julius Meyer; 5 October 1891 Göttingen, Province of Hanover, Kingdom of Prussia, German Empire
- Died: 11 April 1945 (aged 53) Hessisch Oldendorf, Province of Westphalia, Free State of Prussia, Nazi Germany
- Cause of death: Suicide
- Party: Nazi Party
- Education: Jurisprudence and political science, Ph.D.
- Alma mater: Lausanne University; University of Bonn; University of Würzburg
- Profession: Legal consultant
- Known for: Wannsee Conference participant
- Civilian awards: Golden Party Badge

Military service
- Allegiance: German Empire
- Branch/service: Imperial German Army
- Years of service: 1912–1920
- Rank: Hauptmann
- Unit: 68th (6th Rhenish) Infantry Regiment; 363rd Infantry Regiment
- Battles/wars: World War I
- Military awards: Iron Cross, 1st and 2nd class War Merit Cross, 1st and 2nd class with Swords; Wound Badge

Gustav Alfred Julius Meyer (5 October 1891 – 11 April 1945) was a Nazi Party official and politician. He joined the Nazi Party in 1928 and was the Gauleiter of North Westphalia from 1931 to 1945, the Oberpräsident of the Province of Westphalia from 1938 to 1945 and the Reichsstatthalter of Lippe and Schaumburg-Lippe from 1933 to 1945. In 1941 he became the Permanent Deputy to the Reichsminister of the Reich Ministry for the Occupied Eastern Territories. He represented the ministry with Georg Leibbrandt in the January 1942 Wannsee Conference, at which the genocidal Final Solution to the Jewish Question was planned. Near the end of World War II in Europe, Meyer committed suicide in April 1945.

== Early life ==
Meyer was born in Göttingen, the son of a Prussian civil servant who was stationed there for his official duties. The middle-class family was originally from Essen. He was educated at the Gymnasium in Soest, graduating in 1911.

A conservative and a monarchist, Meyer aspired to become a Prussian military officer. However, upon graduation, he entered the University of Lausanne to study law. After one term in Lausanne, he unexpectedly received an appointment as a Fahnenjunker (cadet officer) with the 68th (6th Rhenish) Infantry Regiment in Koblenz in 1912. He passed his officer exam and was commissioned as a Leutnant on 16 June 1913. During World War I he fought with Infantry Regiment 363 on the Western Front, earning the Iron Cross first and second class and the Wound Badge. Promoted to Oberleutnant in June 1916, he was wounded and captured by the French in April 1917. This experience, according to Meyer, was especially traumatic and left him with a hatred against France. Released from captivity in March 1920, the downsized Reichswehr had no use for him and he left the army in October with the rank of Hauptmann.

After the war, Meyer studied jurisprudence and political science at the Universities of Bonn and Würzburg. He graduated with a PhD in 1922 and joined the legal department of a Gelsenkirchen mining firm. In 1924, he joined the local Masonic lodge. Meyer was also the chairman of the local Kyffhäuserbund unit. He married Dorothee Capell in 1925 and had five daughters with her.

== Career in Nazi Germany ==
The Nazi Party was still extremely weak in Westphalia during the late 1920s, and had only about three hundred members in the city of Gelsenkirchen during this period. On 1 April 1928, Meyer joined the Party (membership number 28,738). As an early Party member, he would later be awarded the Golden Party Badge. Later that year, he rose to the position of Ortsgruppenleiter (Local Group Leader) and, on 1 October 1929, he was promoted to Bezirksleiter (District Leader) of the Emscher-Lippe district within Westphalia. In November 1929, he was also elected as the only Nazi party representative to the Gelsenkirchen city council where he remained until January 1931.

In September 1930, Meyer was elected to the Reichstag from electoral constituency 17, Westphalia North, and on 31 January 1931, he was appointed the Nazi Party Gauleiter of the newly-formed Gau Westphalia-North. He also became the editor of the local Party newspaper, the Westfälische Landeszeitung Rot-Erde. On 24 April 1932, he was elected to the Landtag of Prussia and was returned to the Reichstag on 6 November 1932. Following the Nazi seizure of power in 1933, Meyer was appointed to the provincial parliament of the Province of Westphalia on 12 March, becoming its president in April. On 10 April, he was made the province's plenipotentiary to the Reichsrat, serving until its abolition on 14 February 1934. Adolf Hitler appointed him as the federal Reichsstatthalter (Reich Governor) of the German States of Lippe and Schaumburg-Lippe on 16 May 1933. He was again returned to the Reichstag at the election of 12 November 1933, retaining his seat until the fall of the Nazi regime. On 1 August 1934, he was named to Hans Frank's Academy for German Law. Additionally, he also became the Staatsminister (Minister of State) in charge of the state government of Lippe, succeeding Hans-Joachim Riecke, effective 1 February 1936. He also was named a Minister of State in the Schaumburg-Lippe government of Landespräsident (State President) Karl Dreier. Finally, on 4 November 1938 he was made Oberpräsident of the Province of Westphalia, thus uniting under his control the highest party and governmental offices in his jurisdictions. In the Nazi paramilitary organization, the Sturmabteilung, he was promoted to SA-Gruppenführer on 20 April 1936 and to SA-Obergruppenführer on 9 November 1938.

On 6 September 1939, Meyer was made Chef der Zivilverwaltung (Chief of Civil Administration) in the West. On 29 May 1940 he was appointed Acting Reich Defense Commissioner for Military District VI during the absence in Norway of Josef Terboven. On 17 July 1941 he was named Ständiger Stellvertreter (permanent deputy) to Reichsminister Alfred Rosenberg in the newly-established Reich Ministry for the Occupied Eastern Territories (RMO). Meyer was responsible for the departments of politics, administration and economics. In his role in the East, he used workers that were mainly Jewish for slave labor assigned to a variety of works.

=== Wannsee Conference participant ===
The meeting minutes of the Wannsee Conference showing "Gauleiter Dr. Meyer" at the top of the participant list.

On 20 January 1942, Meyer was Rosenberg's representative at the Wannsee Conference, which was called to discuss the implementation of the Final Solution. The official minutes of the conference indicate that Meyer and Josef Bühler, the representative of the General Government, both expressed the opinion that preparatory measures for the Final Solution should be carried out immediately in their respective jurisdictions. Nine days after the conference, Meyer convened a meeting at the RMO office for representatives of several other ministries and the armed forces high command (OKW). The RMO representatives advocated broadening the definition of who was a Jew. They supported the position of SS-Obergruppenführer Reinhard Heydrich, who had chaired the Wannsee meeting, that Mischlinge of the first degree should be included. Meyer wrote a letter on 16 July 1942 proposing that a request be addressed to Hitler urging that a decision be made on the Mischlinge question.

== Defeat and death ==
On 16 November 1942, Meyer was made Reich Defense Commissioner for his Gau. During the war, he was awarded the War Merit Cross, 1st and 2nd class with Swords. On 25 September 1944, he became the commander of Nazi Volksturm militia forces in his Gau. He made plans to construct a "Westphalia Wall" to serve as a defensive position but the Allied assault proved unstoppable, and Münster fell to the combined British and American forces on 3 April 1945. In mid-May 1945, a body, decomposed beyond recognition but later determined to be Meyer, was found in Hessisch Oldendorf by the River Weser. Next to the body was a pistol and a suicide note, in which the unrepentant Nazi wrote: "The last part of my Gau was lost today. We defended Rinteln and the Weser bravely. In the last free part of my Gau I take leave of the Führer, to whom my most heartfelt wishes belong, [and] of Germany."

== Fictional portrayals ==
Meyer was portrayed by Harald Dietl in the 1984 German film Die Wannseekonferenz, by Brian Pettifer in the 2001 BBC/HBO film Conspiracy and by Peter Jordan in the 2022 German film Die Wannseekonferenz.

== Sources ==
- Alfred Meyer entry in the Westfälische Geschichte internet portal
- Höffkes, Karl (1986). Hitlers Politische Generale. Die Gauleiter des Dritten Reiches: ein biographisches Nachschlagewerk. Tübingen: Grabert-Verlag. ISBN 3-87847-163-7.
- Miller, Michael D.; Schulz, Andreas (2017). Gauleiter: The Regional Leaders of the Nazi Party and Their Deputies, 1925-1945. Vol. 2 (Georg Joel - Dr. Bernhard Rust). R. James Bender Publishing. ISBN 978-1-932-97032-6.
- Priamus, Heinz-Jürgen (2017). "Alfred Meyer, Reich Ministry for the Occupied Eastern Territories:From German Monarchist to Nazi Desk Perpetrator". In Jasch, Hans-Christian; Kreutzmüller, Christoph (eds.). The Participants: The Men of the Wannsee Conference. Berghahn Books. ISBN 978-1-785-33671-3.

== External website ==
- Dr. Alfred Meyer (1891-1945) in the House of the Wannsee Conference Memorial and Education Site
- Information about Alfred Meyer in the Reichstag database
- Minutes from the Wannsee Conference, archived by the Progressive Review
