= Herbert Backe =

German Nazi politician and SS functionary (1896–1947)

- Backe in 1942

Reichsminister of Food & Agriculture
- In office 6 April 1944 – 23 May 1945 (Acting since 23 May 1942)
- Chancellor: Adolf Hitler; Joseph Goebbels; Lutz Graf Schwerin von Krosigk
- Preceded by: Richard Walther Darré
- Succeeded by: Position abolished

State Secretary of the Food & Agriculture Ministry
- In office 27 October 1933 – 6 April 1944
- Chancellor: Adolf Hitler
- Supervisor: Richard Walther Darré
- Preceded by: Hans Joachim von Rohr
- Succeeded by: Hans-Joachim Riecke

Personal details
- Born: Herbert Friedrich Wilhelm Backe; 1 May 1896 Batumi, Kutais Governorate, Russian Empire
- Died: 6 April 1947 (aged 50) Nuremberg Prison, Bavaria, Allied-occupied Germany
- Cause of death: Suicide by hanging
- Party: Nazi Party
- Education: University of Göttingen
- Profession: Agronomist

Herbert Friedrich Wilhelm Backe (1 May 1896 – 6 April 1947) was a German politician and SS-Obergruppenführer (equivalent to the rank of lieutenant general in Nazi Germany) who served as State Secretary and Reichsminister in the Reich Ministry of Food and Agriculture. He was a doctrinaire racial ideologue, a long-time associate of Richard Walther Darré and a personal friend of Reinhard Heydrich. He developed and implemented the Hunger Plan that envisioned death by starvation of tens of millions of Slavic and Jewish "useless eaters" following Operation Barbarossa, the 1941 invasion of the Soviet Union.

The Hunger Plan was developed during the organization phase of Operation Barbarossa and provided for diverting and redirecting of Ukrainian food stuffs away from central and northern Russia for the benefit of the invading army and the population in Germany. As a result, millions of local civilians died in the German-occupied territories. Backe was arrested in 1945 at the end of World War II and was due to be tried for war crimes at Nuremberg in the Ministries Trial, but committed suicide in his prison cell in 1947.

== Biography ==
Herbert Backe was born on 1 May 1896 in Batumi, Georgia, the son of a retired Prussian lieutenant turned trader. His mother was a Caucasus German, whose family had emigrated from Württemberg to Russia in the early 19th century. He studied at the Tbilisi gymnasium (grammar school) from 1905 and was interned on the outbreak of World War I as an enemy alien because he was a citizen of Prussia. This experience of being imprisoned for being German and witnessing the beginning of the Russian Revolution made Backe an anti-communist.

Backe moved to Germany during the Russian Civil War with the help of the Swedish Red Cross. In Germany, he initially worked as a laborer, and enrolled to study agronomy at the University of Göttingen in 1920. After completing his studies he briefly worked in agriculture and then became an assistant lecturer on agricultural geography at Hanover Technical University. In 1926, he submitted his doctoral dissertation (Note: German: Die russische Getreidewirtschaft als Grundlage der Land- und Volkswirtschaft Russlands [The Russian Grain Economy as the Basis for the Agrarian and People Economy of Russia] (self-published version, with a run of 10,000 copies, submitted in 1941 to the German authorities in occupied Soviet Union).) to the University of Göttingen, but it was rejected. "Backe's thesis was in fact a manifesto for racial imperialism", where an upper class of German occupiers would fight against the local, 'ethnically inferior' population for the control of their foodstuff.

Backe joined the SA in 1922, and in 1925 he joined the Nazi Party at Hanover. After the dissolution of the regional political entity (Gau) for South-Hanover, Backe let his membership expire. In 1927, Backe was inspector and administrator on a big farm in Pomerania. In 1928, he was married to Ursula. With financial support of his father-in-law, in November 1928 he became tenant of domain Hornsen, with around 950 acres in the district of Alfeld. He proceeded to lead the farm successfully. On 27 October 1933, after the Nazi seizure of power, Backe became the State Secretary in the Reich Ministry of Food and Agriculture, and in the same month he joined the SS. Backe became a member of the Prussian State Council and in October 1936 he was made the agricultural representative to Hermann Göring's Four Year Plan. When Reichsminister of Food and Agriculture Richard Walther Darré was placed on an extended leave of absence on 23 May 1942, Backe was charged with carrying out his responsibilities, among which was his role as Reich Farmers Leader in the Nazi Party national leadership, though nominally remaining State Secretary. On 9 November 1942, Backe was promoted to SS-Senior Group Leader (SS-Obergruppenführer), a rank roughly equivalent to lieutenant general. On 6 April 1944, Hitler named Backe as Darré's successor as Reichsminister of the Reich Ministry of Food and Agriculture.

Backe was a prominent member of the younger generation of Nazi technocrats who occupied second-tier administrative positions in the Nazi system, such as Reinhard Heydrich, Werner Best, and Wilhelm Stuckart. Like Stuckart, who held the real power in the Interior Ministry (officially led by Wilhelm Frick) and Wilhelm Ohnesorge in the Reich Postal Ministry (officially led by the conservative Paul Eltz-Rübenach), Backe had already been the de facto Reichsminister of Food and Agriculture under Darré, even before he formally attained the position.

== Hunger Plan ==
Alfred Rosenberg, the Reichsminister for the Occupied Eastern Territories nominated Backe as the Secretary of State of the Reichskommissariat Ukraine where he could implement his radical and racist policies, the Hunger Plan (Der Hungerplan, or Der Backe-Plan). Its objective was to inflict deliberate mass starvation on the Slavic civilian populations under German occupation by directing all food supplies to the German home population and the German Armed forces on the Eastern Front. The most important accomplice of Herbert Backe was Hans-Joachim Riecke, who headed the agricultural section of the Economic Staff East. According to the historian Timothy Snyder, "4.2 million Soviet citizens (largely Russians, Belarusians, and Ukrainians) were starved by the German occupiers in 1941–1944" as a direct, attributable result of Backe's designs.

== Arrest and suicide ==
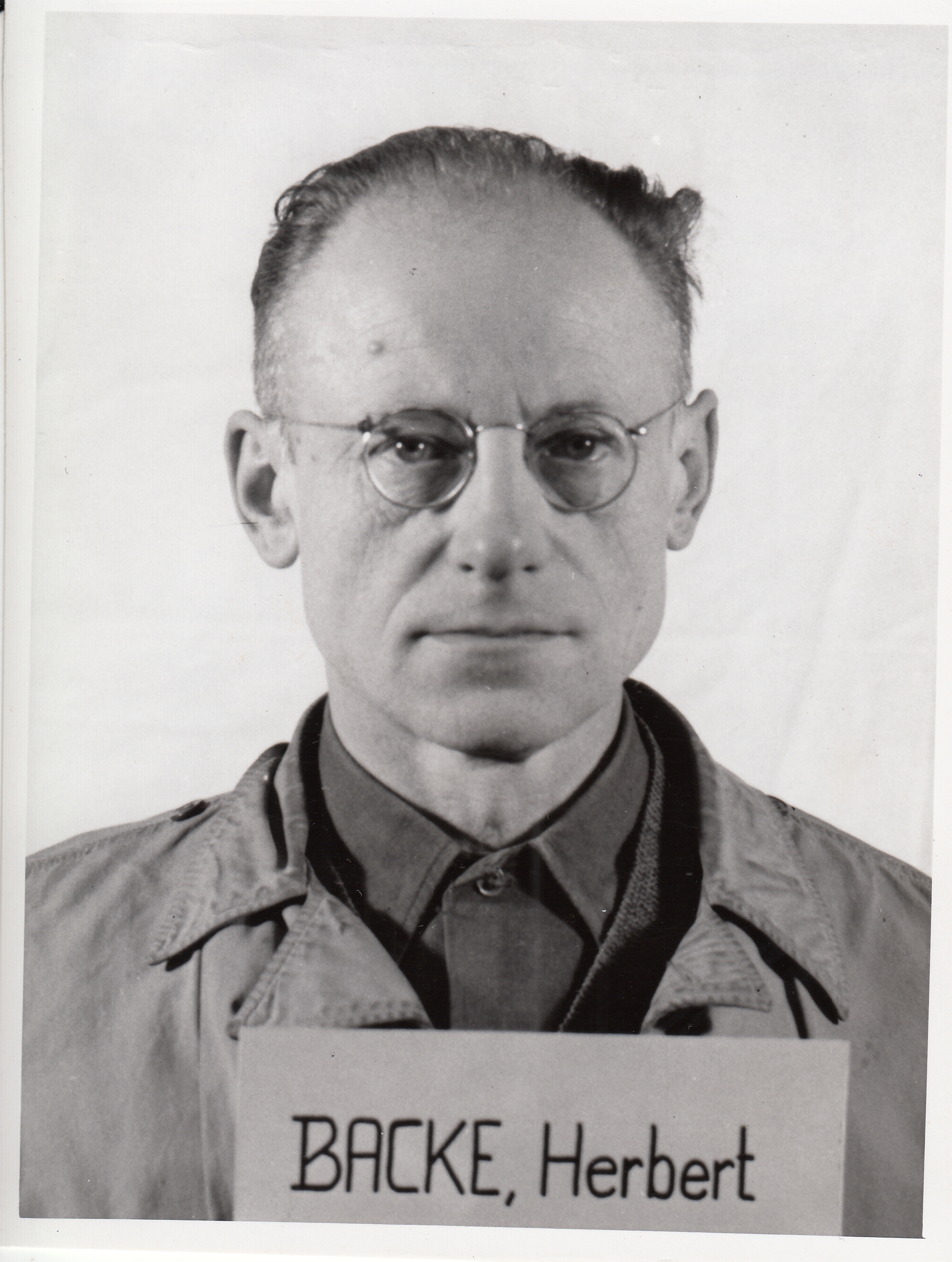
Backe in U.S. custody, c. 1946–47

Backe was retained as Reichsminister of Food and Agriculture in Hitler's will and he remained in that position in the short-lived Flensburg Government led by Grossadmiral Karl Dönitz until 23 May 1945.

After the German Instrument of Surrender, Backe was ordered by the allies to fly to Eisenhower's headquarters in Reims, along with Julius Dorpmüller, the Reichsminister of Transport. (Note: Dönitz wrote: "Mitte Mai bekamen der Verkehrsminister Dr. Dorpmüller und der Ernährungsminister Backe von den Alliierten Anweisung, ins amerikanische Hauptquartier zu fliegen. Da sie in den Problemen ihres Ressorts besonders häufig mit den alliierten Kontrollbehörden in Mürwik verkehrt hatten, glaubten sie, der Flug nach Reims solle ihrer zukünftigen praktischen Mitarbeit auf ihren Tätigkeitsgebieten dienen. Wir hörten jedoch nichts mehr von ihnen. Sehr viel später erfuhr ich, daß zum mindesten Backe nicht zur Mitarbeit, sondern in die Gefangenschaft weggeflogen war." ["In mid-May the Minister of transport Dr. Dorpmüller and the Minister of Food and Agriculture Backe were instructed by the Allies to fly to the American headquarters. Since they had frequently interacted on the problems of their departments with the Allied Control Authorities in Mürwik, they believed that the flight to Reims would serve their future cooperation in their fields of activity. However, we heard nothing more of them. Very much later, I learned that at least Backe was flown out not to cooperate, but to be put in captivity.]") Backe thought the Americans would need him as an expert to handle Germany's imminent starvation and had prepared himself for an expected conversation on that subject with General Dwight D. Eisenhower; he was surprised when he was arrested instead.

In a letter to his wife on 31 January 1946, he defended Nazism as one of the "greatest ideas of all times", which "found its strongest blow in the National Socialist agricultural policy".

In Allied captivity, Backe was interrogated during the Nuremberg trials of 21 February and 14 March 1947. In his cell in the Nuremberg war criminals' prison, Backe wrote two treatises: a so-called "big report" about his life and his work on Nazism, and a testament outline for his wife Ursula and his four children, dated 31 January 1946.

Due to his fear of being extradited to the Soviet Union, Backe committed suicide by hanging himself in his prison cell on 6 or 7 April 1947.

== See also ==
- Glossary of Nazi Germany
- List of Nazi Party leaders and officials
- List of people who died by suicide by hanging

== Sources ==
- Gesine, Gérard (2009). "Food and Genocide. Nazi Agrarian Politics in the occupied territories of the Soviet Union". Contemporary European History. 18 (1): 45–65. doi:10.1017/S0960777308004827. S2CID 155045613.
- Heim, Susanne (2008). Plant Breeding and Agrarian Research in Kaiser-Wilhelm-Institutes, 1933–1945. Calories, Caoutchouc, Careers. New York City: Springer. ISBN 978-1-40206-718-1.
- Lehmann, Joachim (1993). "Herbert Backe – Technokrat und Agrarideologe". In Ronald Smelser; Enrico Syring; Rainer Zitelmann (eds.). Die braune Elite II (in German). Darmstadt: Wissenschaftliche Buchgesellschaft. ISBN 3534801229.
- Snyder, Timothy. Bloodlands: Europe Between Hitler and Stalin. London: The Bodley Head, 2010. ISBN 978-0-224-08141-2.
- Tooze, Adam (2008). The Wages of Destruction: The Making and Breaking of Nazi Economy (ebook reprint ed.). Penguin Books. ISBN 9781101564950.
- Williams, Max (2015). SS Elite: The Senior Leaders of Hitler's Praetorian Guard. Vol. I. Fonthill Media LLC. ISBN 978-1-78155-433-3.
- Zentner, Christian and Friedemann Bedürftig. The Encyclopedia of the Third Reich. New York: Macmillan, 1991. ISBN 978-0-1431-1320-1.
