= Hunger Plan =

Mass starvation plan by Nazi Germany

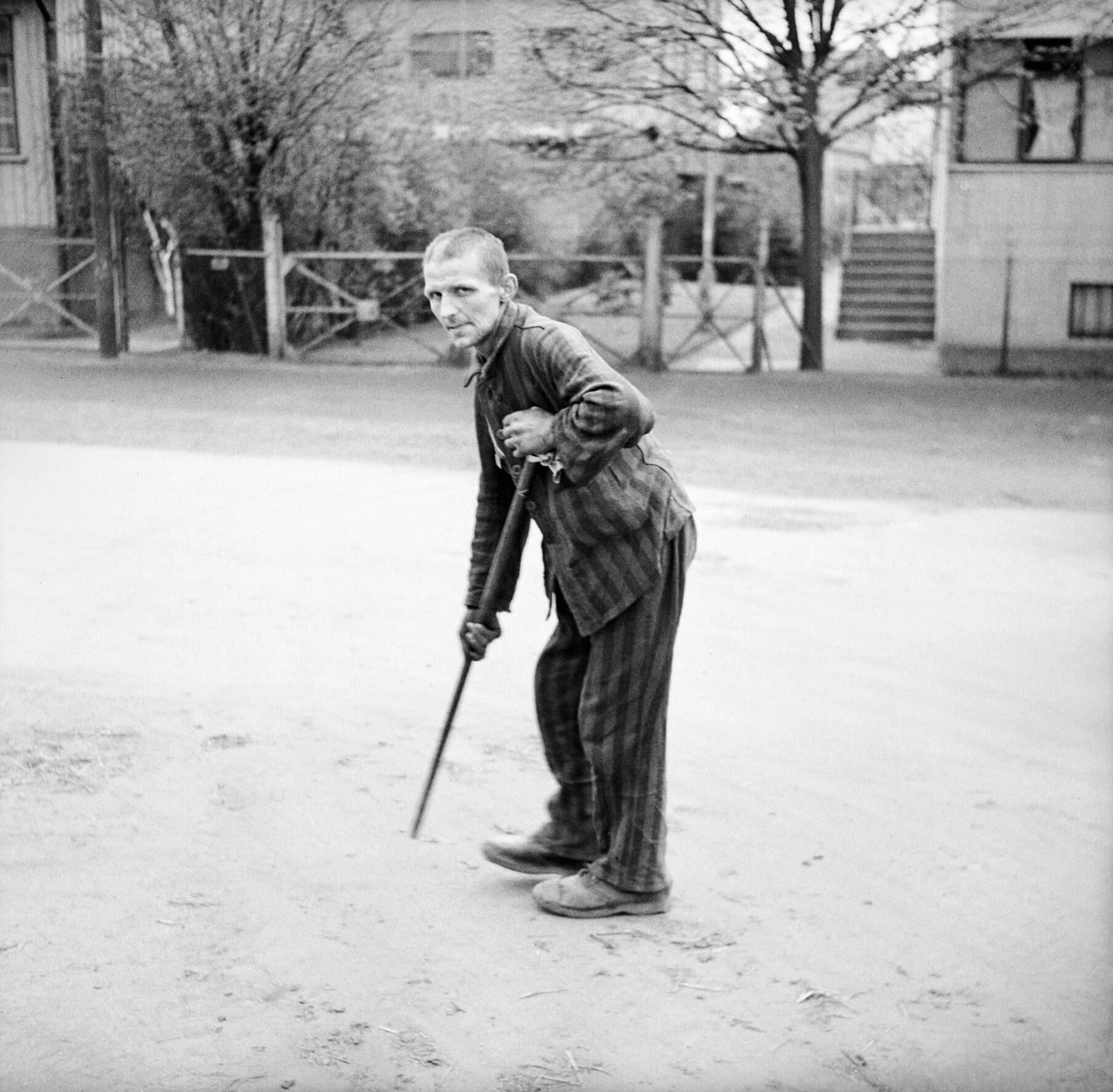
A half-starved Soviet citizen outside the liberated Stalag XIB prison in April, 1945.

The Hunger Plan (German: Hungerplan or Backe-Plan) was a partially implemented plan developed by Nazi bureaucrats during World War II to seize food from the Soviet Union and give it to German soldiers and civilians. The plan entailed the genocide by starvation of millions of Soviet citizens following Operation Barbarossa, the 1941 invasion of the Soviet Union (see Generalplan Ost). The plan created a famine as an act of policy, killing millions of people.

The Hunger Plan was first formulated by senior German officials during a Staatssekretäre meeting on 2 May 1941 to prepare for the Wehrmacht (German armed forces) invasion and the Nazi war of extermination (Vernichtungskrieg) in Eastern Europe. Its means of mass murder were outlined in several documents, including one that became known as Göring's Green Folder. As part of the plan, Nazi military forces were ordered to capture food stocks in occupied territories, redirect them to supply German troops and fuel the German war economy. In addition to the extensive exploitation of resources to support the German war economy, the Hunger Plan intended to create an artificial famine in Eastern Europe, which would have resulted in deaths of around 31 to 45 million inhabitants through forced starvation.

== Background ==
Germany in the 1930s, like other European countries, was not self-sufficient and relied on foreign imports to feed its population, a situation worsened with the outbreak of war as the military recruited labourers, requisitioned tractors and horses, and was first priority for fuel. Overall food consumption needed to be reduced. The situation was even worse by 1941, as reserve grain stocks had been consumed and the occupation of large parts of Europe had only worsened the situation, as most of these countries were also net food importers.

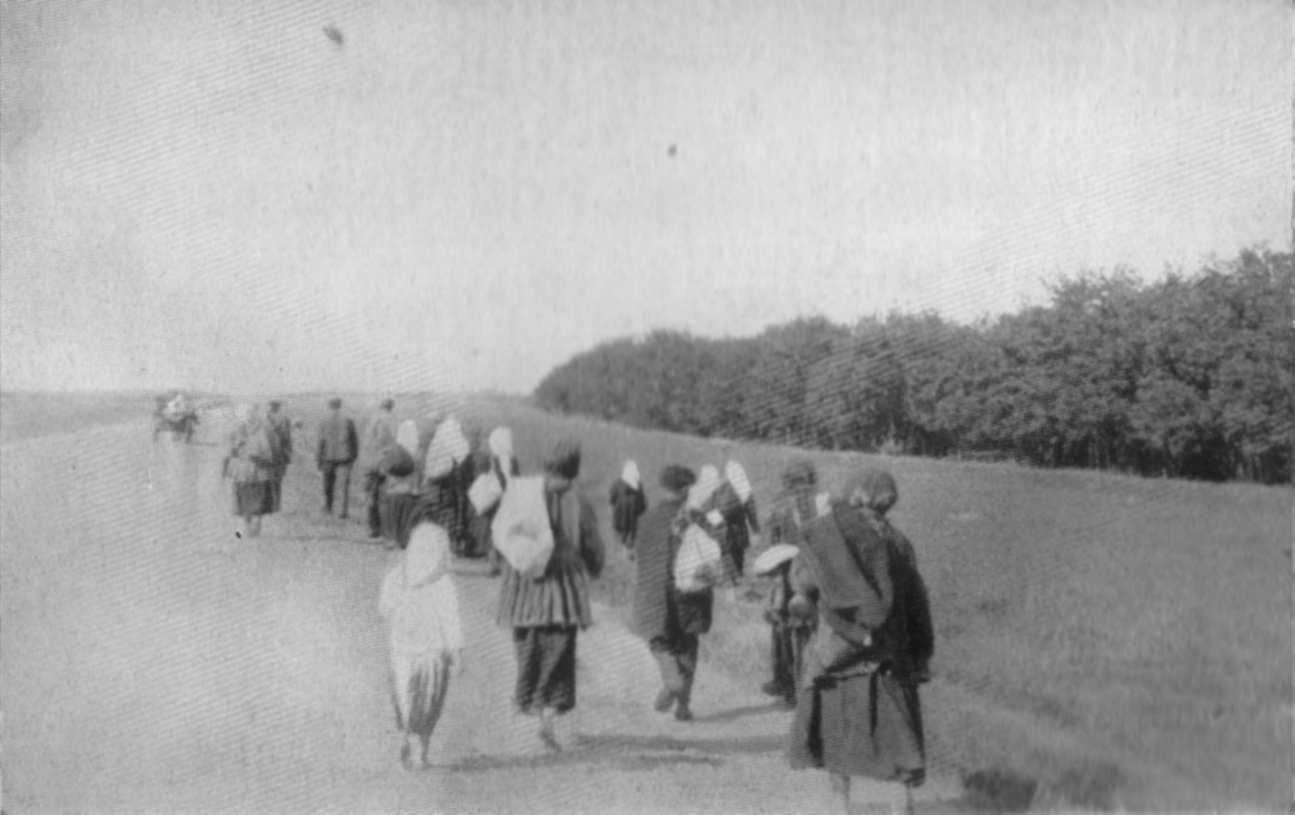
Migration of farmers due to hunger in Austria, 1933.

German leadership, especially Hitler, was very concerned about the impact of reductions in food consumption on civilian morale. They believed the Allied blockade of Germany during the First World War had been a key cause of Germany's defeat in that war. Thus the preservation of food supplies for Germany itself was considered essential, even at the cost of civilian lives in occupied countries. The combination of German leadership's strong racism against Jews and Soviet civilians and the pressing wartime food crisis proved a deadly combination – the Hunger Plan was based on both practical and ideological needs.

== Plan ==
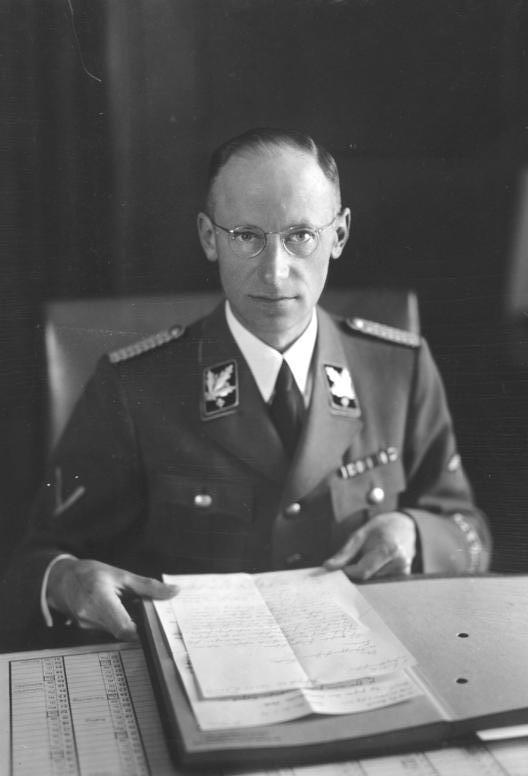
Herbert Backe, architect of the Hunger Plan

The architect of the Hunger Plan was Herbert Backe. Together with others, including Heinrich Himmler, Backe led a coalition of Nazi politicians dedicated to securing Germany's food supply. The Hunger Plan may have been decided on almost as soon as Hitler announced his intention to invade the Soviet Union in December 1940. Certainly by 2 May 1941, it was in the advanced stages of planning and was ready for discussion between all the major Nazi state ministries and the Oberkommando der Wehrmacht (OKW) office of economics, headed by General Georg Thomas. The lack of capacity of the Soviet railways, the inadequacy of road transport and the shortages of fuel, meant that the German Army would have to feed itself by living off the land in the territories they conquered in the western regions of the Soviet Union.

A meeting on 2 May 1941 between the permanent secretaries responsible for logistical planning for the invasion of the Soviet Union, as well as other high-ranking Nazi Party functionaries, state officials and military officers, included in its conclusions:

1. The war can only be continued if the entire Wehrmacht is fed from Russia in the third year of the war.
2. If we take what we need out of the country, there can be no doubt that tens of millions of people will die of starvation.

The minutes of the meeting exemplify German planning for the occupation of the Soviet Union. They present a deliberate decision on the life and death of vast parts of the local population as a logical, inevitable development. Three weeks later, on 23 May 1941, economic policy guidelines for the coming invasion were produced by Hans-Joachim Riecke's agricultural section of the Economic Staff East, which had direct responsibility for the economic and agricultural exploitation of the soon-to-be occupied Soviet territories:

Many tens of millions of people in this country will become superfluous and will die or must emigrate to Siberia. Attempts to rescue the population there from death through starvation by obtaining surpluses from the black earth zone [...] prevent the possibility of Germany holding out till the end of the war.

The perceived grain surpluses of Ukraine figured particularly prominently in the vision of a "self-sufficient" Germany. Hitler himself had stated in August 1939 that Germany needed "the Ukraine, in order that no one is able to starve us again as in the last war". Ukraine did not produce enough grain for export to solve Germany's problems. Scooping off the agricultural surplus in Ukraine for the purpose of feeding the Reich called for:

1. annihilation of what the German regime perceived as a superfluous population (Jews, and the population of Ukrainian large cities such as Kiev, which received no supplies at all);
2. extreme reduction of rations for Ukrainians in the remaining cities; and
3. reduction in foodstuffs consumed by the farming population.
4. creation of a northern grain deficit zone and southern grain surplus zone in the USSR. The southern surplus zone, where Ukraine was, would produce surpluses of grain that would be sent to the Reich. The northern zone, where the cities and industrial centers were, would starve.

Discussing the plan, Backe noted a "surplus population" in Russia of 20 to 30 million. If that population were cut off from food, that food could be used for the invading German Army and the German population. Industrialization had created an urban population of many millions in the Soviet Union. Great suffering among the native Soviet population was envisaged, with tens of millions of deaths expected within the first year of the German occupation. Carefully planned starvation was to be an integral part of the German campaign, and the German planners believed that the assault on the Soviet Union could not succeed without it. According to Gesine Gerhard, German agricultural officials saw the Hunger Plan as a solution to the European food crisis and a method for exterminating the "undesirable" Soviet population.

== Effects of the plan ==
The Hunger Plan caused the deaths of millions of citizens in the German-occupied territories of the Soviet Union. The historian Timothy Snyder estimates that "4.2 million Soviet citizens (largely Russians, Belarusians, and Ukrainians) [were] starved by the German occupiers in 1941–1944". Starvation rates were particularly high among Jews, whom the Nazis forced into ghettos, and Soviet prisoners of war under German control. Jews were prohibited from purchasing eggs, butter, milk, meat or fruit. Rations for Jews in Minsk and other cities within the control of Army Group Centre provided no more than 1,800 kilojoules (420 kilocalories) per day. Tens of thousands of Jews died of hunger and hunger-related causes over winter 1941–1942.

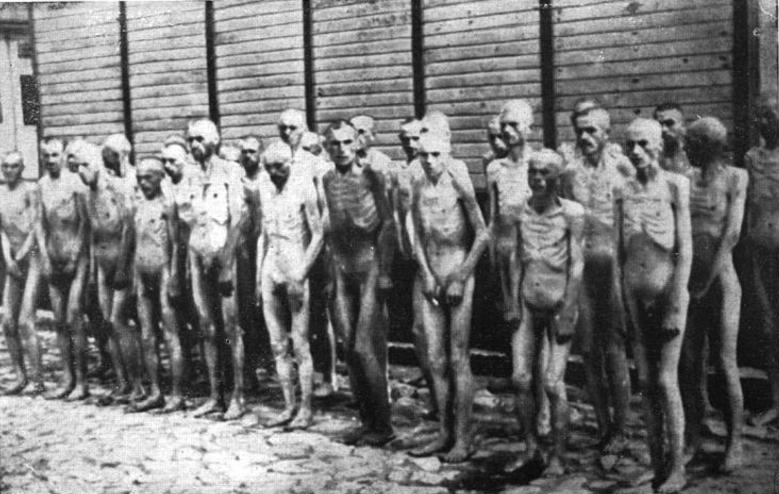
Naked Soviet POWs in Mauthausen concentration camp. Unknown date

The most reliable figures for the death rate among Soviet prisoners of war in German captivity reveal that 3.3 million died of a total of 5.7 million captured between June 1941 and February 1945, most of them directly or indirectly from starvation. Of these 3.3 million, 2 million had already died by the beginning of February 1942. The enormous number of deaths was the result of a deliberate policy of starvation directed against Soviet POWs. The German planning staffs had reckoned on capturing and thus having to feed up to two million prisoners within the first eight weeks of the war, i.e. roughly the same number as during the Battle of France in 1940. The number of French, Belgian and Dutch POWs who died in German captivity was extremely low compared with deaths among Soviet POWs.

By the end of 1941, plans to starve the entire civilian population of some areas had been abandoned, due to the failure of the German military campaign and the impossibility of cutting off the food supply to cities without causing major uprisings. Except in isolated cases, the Germans lacked the manpower to enforce a 'food blockade' of the Soviet cities; neither could they confiscate the food. The Germans were able to significantly supplement their grain stocks, particularly from the granaries in fertile Ukraine, and cut off the Soviets from them, leading to significant starvation in the Soviet-held territories (most drastically in the Siege of Leningrad, where about one million people died). Germans also tried to starve Kiev and Kharkov in German-occupied Ukraine. During the German occupation, about 80,000 residents of Kharkov died of starvation. The lack of food also contributed to the starvation of slaves and concentration camp inmates in Germany.

== Starvation in other German-occupied territories ==
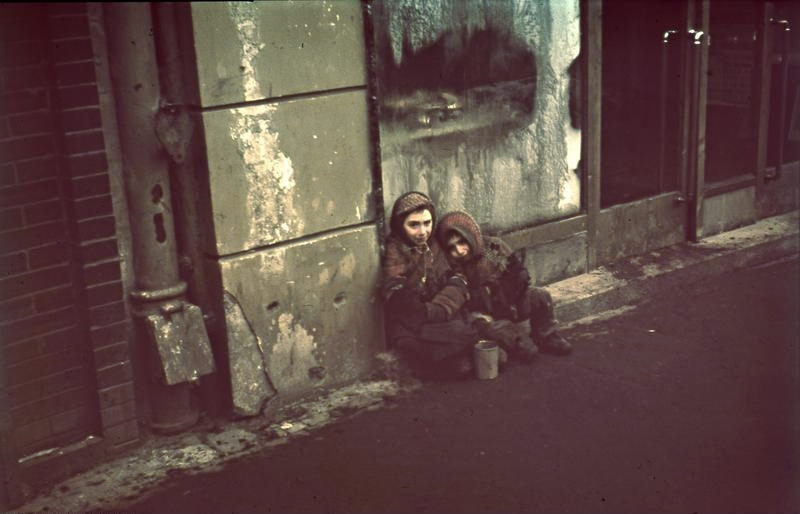
Jewish children in the Warsaw Ghetto sometime between 1940–1943

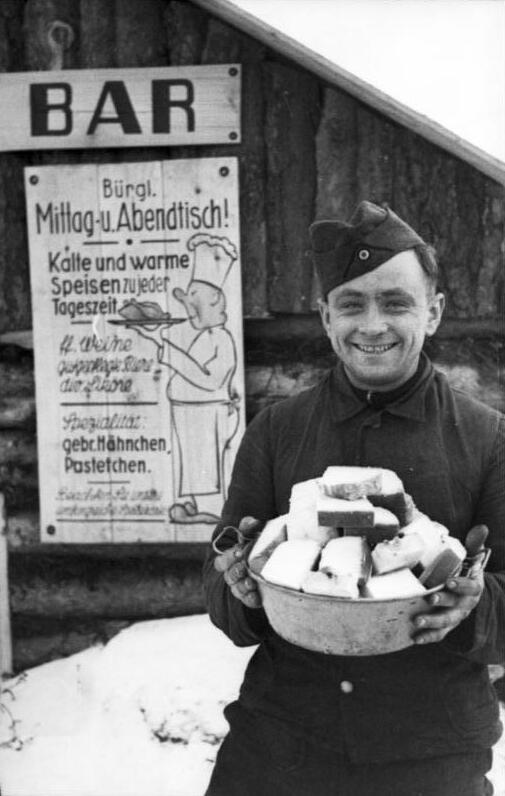
A German soldier carrying a pot with bread in Lapland

The Hunger Plan directed against the population of Soviet cities and grain-deficit territories was unique—the Nazis formulated no similar plan against the inhabitants of other German-occupied territories. However, starvation affected other parts of German-occupied Europe, including Greece (more than 300,000 Greeks died of starvation during the Great Famine) and the General Government of Poland. Unlike in the Soviet Union, in Poland the Jewish population in ghettos (especially in the Warsaw Ghetto) suffered the most, although ethnic Poles also faced increasing levels of starvation. Raul Hilberg estimated that "in the whole of occupied Poland 500,000 to 600,000 Jews died in ghettos and labor camps", in part due to starvation. In early 1943, Hans Frank, the German governor of Poland, estimated that three million Poles would face starvation as a result of the Plan. In August, the Polish capital Warsaw was cut off from grain deliveries. Only the bumper harvest of 1943 and the collapsing Eastern Front of 1944 saved the Poles from starvation. Western Europe was third on the German list for the re-distribution of food, which was also shipped to Germany from France and other occupied territories in the West, but these were never subjected to the genocidal starvation experienced in the East. As many as 22,000 people died during the Dutch famine of 1944–1945 as a result of an embargo placed by the Germans on transporting food into the country.

By mid-1941, the German minority in Poland received 10,930 kJ (2,613 kcal) per day, while Poles received 2,920 kJ (699 kcal) and Jews in the ghetto 770 kJ (184 kcal). The Jewish ration supplied a mere 7.5 percent of human daily needs, and Polish rations only 26 percent. Only the rations allocated to Germans fulfilled the full needs of their daily caloric intake.

== See also ==
- Drang nach Osten
- Effects of the siege of Leningrad
- Final Solution
- Generalplan Ost
- Extermination of Soviet prisoners of war by Nazi Germany
- German war crimes
- The Holocaust
- Lebensraum
- New Order (Nazism)
- Pacte de Famine
- Racial policy of Nazi Germany
- War crimes of the Wehrmacht
