= Krappe =

Krappe is a surname. Notable people with the surname include:

- Alexander Haggerty Krappe (1894–1947), American folklorist and author
- Ernst Krappe (1891–1977), German lawyer and politician
- Günther Krappe (1893–1981), German army officer
