= Eastern Territories =

Eastern Territories may refer to:

== Nazi Germany ==
- Polish areas annexed by Nazi Germany, the "incorporated eastern territories" (Eingegliederte Ostgebieten)
- Reichskommissariat Ostland, the civilian occupation regime in the Baltic states (Estonia, Latvia, and Lithuania), in the northeastern part of Poland and in the western part of the Byelorussian Soviet Socialist Republic
- The occupied eastern territories (besetzten Ostgebiete) in the Soviet Union under the nominal administration of the Reich Ministry for the Occupied Eastern Territories

== Post-war Germany ==
- Former eastern territories of Germany (Ehemalige deutsche Ostgebiete)

== Poland ==
- Kresy, former eastern territories of Poland annexed by the Soviet Union in 1945
