= Göring's Green Folder =

1941 Nazi policy document

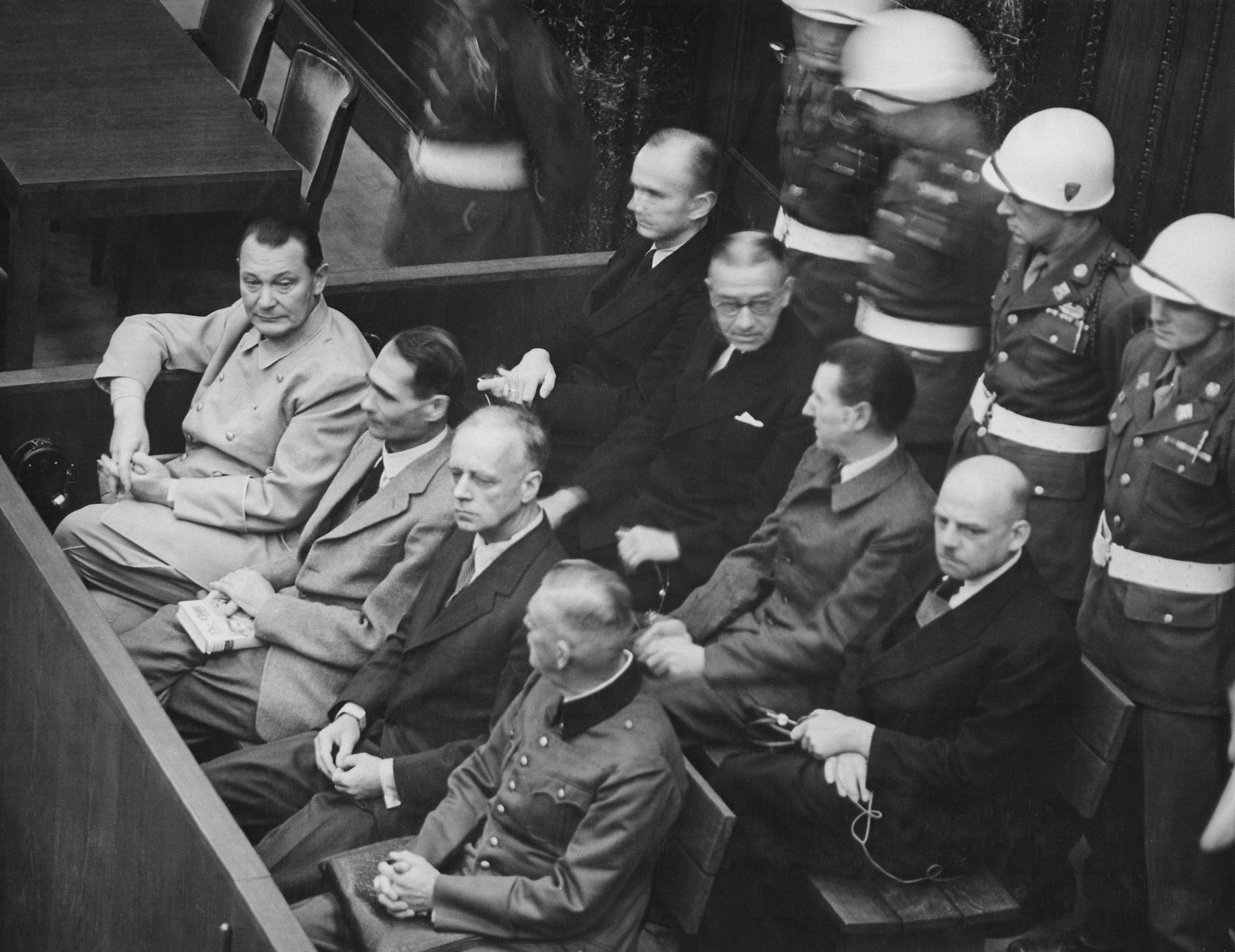
Göring (first row, far left) at the Nuremberg Trials

The "Green Folder" (German: Grüne Mappe) was a document belonging to Reichsmarschall Hermann Göring which was presented in the Nuremberg Trials. This was the master policy directive for the economic exploitation of the conquered Soviet Union. The implications of this document were the deaths by starvation of millions of Slavic people (something that partially came to pass in the Holocaust), the neglect of Soviet soldiers captured by the Nazis which led to huge mortality rates, and the general expropriation of food in the occupied areas of the Soviet Union. It is also referred to as Document of the Soviet Prosecution, Exhibit USSR 10.

== Plan Oldenburg ==
Plan "Oldenburg" (Göring's "Green Folder") was the code-name of the economic subsection of the planned attack on the Soviet Union.

Following Hitler's issuance of Führer Directive 21, which ordered the invasion of the Soviet Union, Hitler instructed Göring to develop a plan for the future exploitation of conquered territory in the East. Under Göring's leadership, a plan known as Oldenburg was created to include the seizing for the service of the Reich all stocks of raw materials and large industrial enterprises in the territory between the Vistula and the Urals. According to this plan the most valuable manufacturing equipment was to be sent to the Reich and that which was not sent to Germany would be destroyed. The European part of the Soviet Union would be economically decentralized and be turned into an agricultural appendage of Germany.

The original plan was approved at a secret meeting on March 1, 1941 (protocol 1317-PS). Over the next two months the plan was fleshed out in detail and finally adopted on April 29, 1941 (protocol secret meeting 1157-PS). A headquarters was formed to coordinate the "Oldenburg" plan.

According to the plan, the territory to be occupied in the Soviet Union would be divided into five economic Inspectorates, three of them attached to Army Group North (Leningrad), Army Group Centre (Moscow), and Army Group South (Kyiv), one for the Caucasus (Baku), and one held in reserve, with 23 economic commandants, as well as 12 offices.

On May 8, 1941, the "Common instructions to all Reich commissioners in the occupied eastern territories" was adopted, based on this plan (documents 1029-PS, 1030-PS).

== Hunger Plan ==
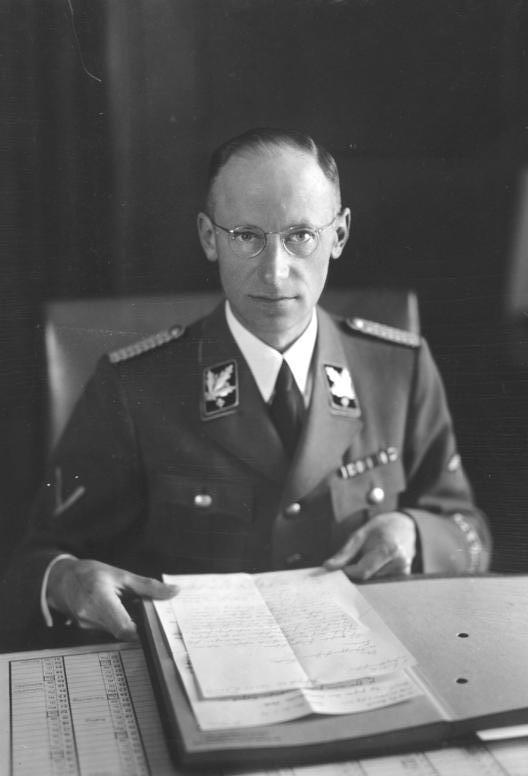
Herbert Backe

A separate committee was formed to organize the collection of food in the occupied territories, as per Herbert Backe's Hunger Plan. It was tasked with ensuring that by 1942, the German armed forces would be fully nourished by the resources of the Soviet Union, without taking into account the needs of the Soviet populace.

In accordance with the order of the Supreme Command Chief of Staff of the Wehrmacht Wilhelm Keitel (dated June 16, 1941), the main economic challenge for the territories seized from the Soviet Union, was described as "an immediate and full exploitation of the occupied areas in favor of the war economy of Germany, particularly in the areas of food and oil".

Göring, directly supervising the "Oldenburg" headquarters, wrote:

In the East, I intend to loot and pillage effectively. All that may be suitable for the Germans in the East, should be extracted and brought to Germany immediately.

Shortly after the beginning of the German campaign against the Soviet Union, on July 15, 1941, he wrote in his "Green Folder":

Use of the occupied territories should be made primarily in the food and oil sectors of economy. Get to Germany as much food and oil as possible – that is the main economic goal of the campaign.

Initially, the German military leadership believed that, during the war, it would not be necessary to rebuild the Soviet Union's industry or to use its natural wealth, and that a policy of seizing only finished products and raw materials in warehouses would be sufficient.

Subsequently, they made an accounting of industry and mines to ensure their safety and to establish civil administration of captured territories. When the expected rapid end of the war did not materialize and Germany suffered great losses in manpower, equipment and weapons, the existing stocks began to be depleted quickly. The German leadership urgently started to develop a plan for the economic use of the occupied territories during the war itself. Thus, the German leadership was forced to abandon the implementation of the plan Oldenburg, recognizing its unsuitability.

After the war ended, the activities of Staff Oldenburg were the subject of consideration and condemnation at the Nuremberg Tribunal.

== See also ==
- A–A line
- Generalplan Ost
- Operation Barbarossa
- Reichskommissariat — particularly the areas within and adjacent to Lebensraum territory
- World War II
