= Lippe Landtag elections in the Weimar Republic =

German state elections

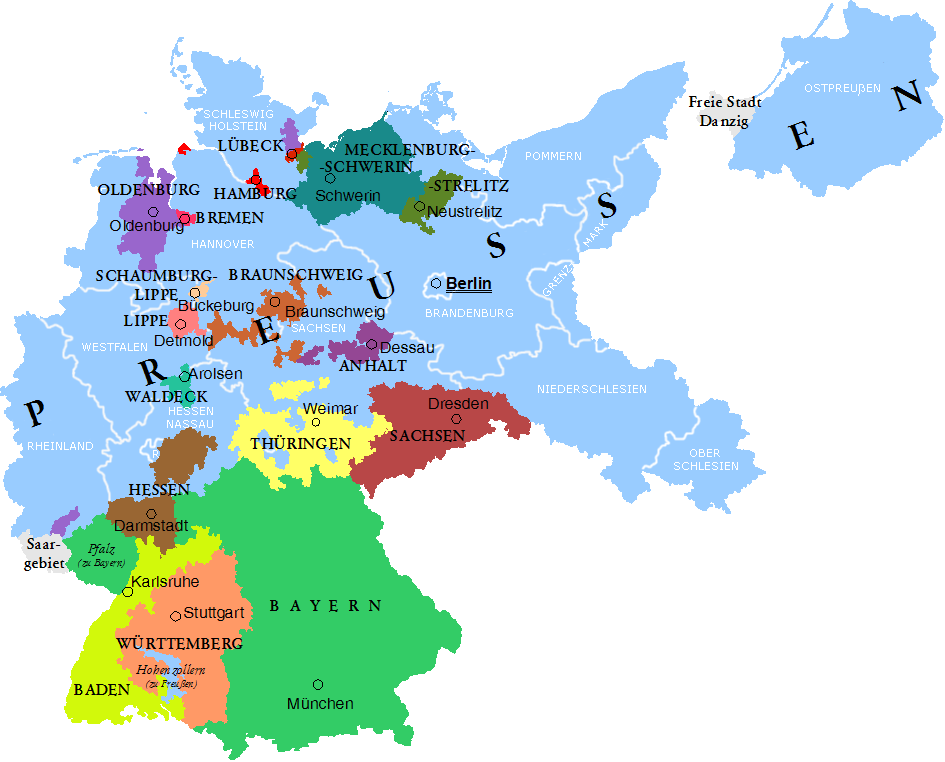
Lippe in the Weimar Republic. At the center-left in salmon-pink.

Landtag elections in the Free State of Lippe (Freistaat Lippe) during the Weimar Republic were held at irregular intervals between 1919 and 1933. Results with regard to the total vote, the percentage of the vote won and the number of seats allocated to each party are presented in the tables below. On 31 March 1933, the sitting Landtag was dissolved by the Nazi-controlled central government and reconstituted to reflect the distribution of seats in the national Reichstag. The Landtag subsequently was formally abolished as a result of the "Law on the Reconstruction of the Reich" of 30 January 1934 which replaced the German federal system with a unitary state.

== 1919 ==
The 1919 Lippe state election was held on 26 January 1919 to elect the 21 members of the Landtag.

Party	Votes	%	Seats
Social Democratic Party of Germany	38,104	50.14	11
German National People's Party	16,973	22.33	5
German Democratic Party	15,061	19.82	4
Lippe Electoral Association	5,855	7.70	1
Total	75,993	100.00	21
Valid votes	75,993	99.45	
Invalid/blank votes	421	0.55	
Total votes	76,414	100.00	
Registered voters/turnout	86,849	87.98	
Source: Elections in the Weimar Republic, Elections in Germany

== 1921 ==
The 1921 Lippe state election was held on 23 January 1921 to elect the 20 members of the Landtag.

Party	Votes	%	Seats	+/–
Social Democratic Party of Germany	25,751	32.66	8	–3
German National People's Party	17,958	22.78	5	0
German People's Party	15,435	19.58	4	New
German Democratic Party	9,034	11.46	2	–2
Union Federation	4,514	5.73	1	New
Communist Party of Germany	3,728	4.73	1	New
Independent Social Democratic Party of Germany	2,416	3.06	0	New
Total	78,836	100.00	21	0
Valid votes	78,836	99.29		
Invalid/blank votes	567	0.71		
Total votes	79,403	100.00		
Registered voters/turnout	89,751	88.47		
Source: Elections in the Weimar Republic, Elections in Germany

== 1925 ==
The 1925 Lippe state election was held on 18 January 1925 to elect the 21 members of the Landtag.

Party	Votes	%	Seats	+/–
Social Democratic Party of Germany	30,144	34.33	8	0
German National People's Party	22,285	25.38	6	+1
German People's Party and Centre Party	13,817	15.74	3	New
German Democratic Party	7,115	8.10	1	-1
Economic Association of House and Land Owners	5,570	6.34	1	New
Union Federation	4,551	5.18	1	0
Communist Party of Germany	3,649	4.16	1	0
National Socialist Freedom Movement	678	0.77	0	New
Total	87,809	100.00	21	0
Valid votes	87,809	98.12		
Invalid/blank votes	1,685	1.88		
Total votes	89,494	100.00		
Registered voters/turnout	94,711	94.49		
Source: Elections in the Weimar Republic, Elections in Germany

== 1929 ==
The 1929 Lippe state election was held on 6 January 1929 to elect the 21 members of the Landtag.

1929 Lippe Landtag Election
Party	Votes	%	Seats	+/–
Social Democratic Party of Germany	31,540	38.98	9	+1
German People's Party	10,054	12.43	3	New
German National People's Party	9,576	11.84	3	–3
Christian-National Peasants' and Farmers' Party	6,412	7.93	2	New
Reich Party of the German Middle Class	5,590	6.91	1	–1
Communist Party of Germany	4,987	6.16	1	0
German Democratic Party	4,495	5.56	1	0
Reich Party for Civil Rights and Deflation	3,225	3.99	1	New
Nazi Party	2,713	3.35	0	New
Catholic People's Representatives (Centre Party)	2,313	2.86	0	New
Total	80,905	100.00	21	0
Valid votes	80,905	98.32		
Invalid/blank votes	1,382	1.68		
Total votes	82,287	100.00		
Registered voters/turnout	107,802	76.33		
Source: Elections in the Weimar Republic, Elections in Germany

== 1933 ==
The 1933 Lippe state election was held on 15 January 1933 to elect the 21 members of the Landtag.

Party	Votes	%	Seats	+/–
Nazi Party	39,064	39.48	9	+9
Social Democratic Party of Germany	29,827	30.15	7	–2
Communist Party of Germany	11,047	11.17	2	+1
German National People's Party	6,009	6.07	1	–2
Evangelical People's Service	4,525	4.57	1	New
German People's Party	4,380	4.43	1	–2
Catholic People's Representatives (Centre Party)	2,556	2.58	0	0
German State Party	832	0.84	0	New
Lippe Rural People	701	0.71	0	New
Total	98,941	100.00	21	0
Valid votes	98,941	99.13		
Invalid/blank votes	871	0.87		
Total votes	99,812	100.00		
Registered voters/turnout	117,286	85.10		
Source: Elections in the Weimar Republic, Elections in Germany
