= Free State of Lippe =

German state (1918–1947)

Coordinates: 51°56′10″N 8°52′41″E

Free State of Lippe Freistaat Lippe (German)
- State of Germany
- 1918–1947
- Flag Coat of arms

- The Free State of Lippe (red) within the Weimar Republic
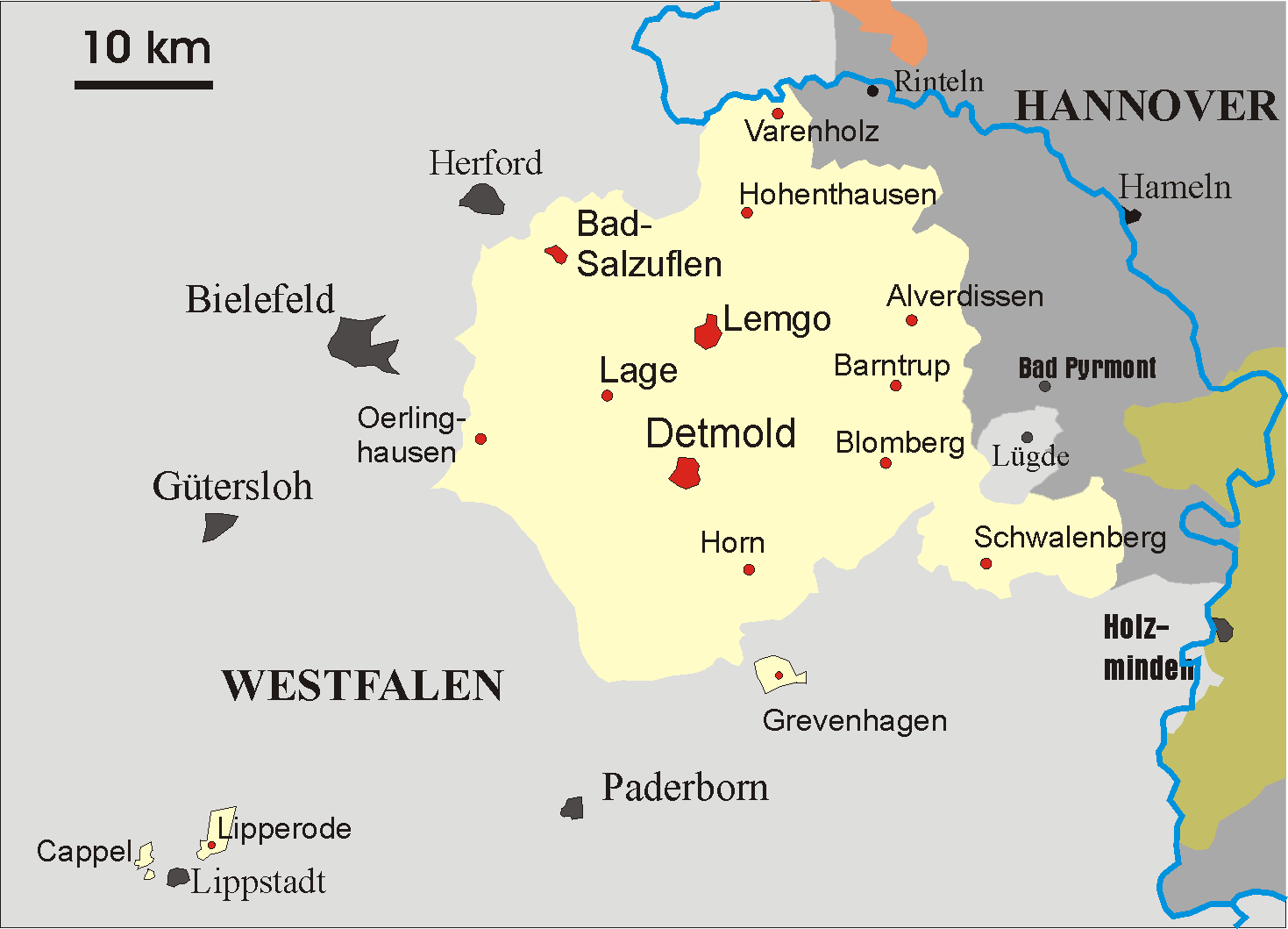
- Free State of Lippe, 1918–1947
- Capital: Detmold
- Area
  - 1925: 1,215.2 km^{2} (469.2 sq mi)
- Population
  - 1925: 163,648
- Government
  - Type: Republic
- Chairman
  - 1918–1920: Clemens Becker
  - 1920–1933: Heinrich Drake
  - 1933: Ernst Krappe
- State President
  - 1933–1936: Hans-Joachim Riecke
  - 1936–1945: Alfred Meyer
  - 1945–1947: Heinrich Drake
- Historical era: Interwar period
  - Established: 12 November 1918
  - Incorporation into North Rhine-Westphalia: 21 January 1947
Preceded by	Succeeded by
Principality of Lippe	North Rhine-Westphalia

The Free State of Lippe (German: Freistaat Lippe) was the successor state to the Principality of Lippe. It was established following the abdication of Prince Leopold IV on 15 November 1918 during the German revolution and was a state of Germany during the Weimar Republic and Nazi Germany. After the end of the Second World War, the British occupation government abolished the state of Lippe in January 1947 and incorporated the area into the new German state of North Rhine-Westphalia.

== History ==
=== German revolution ===
In the final days of World War I, after it had become clear that Germany was facing defeat, the German revolution broke out in the northern port city of Kiel. Workers' and soldiers' councils rapidly spread the revolution across Germany, reaching Detmold, Lippe's capital, on 10 November 1918. A quickly formed people's and soldiers' council forced the abdication of Lippe's Prince Leopold IV two days later. As one of its first acts as Lippe's revolutionary interim government, the council dissolved the Principality's Landtag (parliament). An election for a new Landtag took place on 26 January 1919 under universal, equal, secret and direct suffrage. The moderate-left Social Democratic Party (SPD) received just over 50% of the vote.

The new Landtag set up job creation programs for returning soldiers and supported the construction of new housing. By a treaty signed in October 1919, the Free State took over the domains that had belonged to Lippe's royal house and turned them over for agriculture. The former prince and his family were allowed to keep the residential palace in Detmold.

=== Government ===
A new constitution for the Free State of Lippe was passed on 21 December 1920. It established a state parliament consisting of a Landtag of 21 deputies elected for a term of four years by universal suffrage. The democratic voting system replaced the Principality's three-class franchise which had weighted votes based on the amount of taxes the voters paid. Lippe was the only state in Germany that made the failure to vote punishable by law. The state government consisted of a collective three-man Landespräsidium (State Executive Committee) that was chosen by the Landtag, although not from among its members. The Landespräsidium was headed by a chairman, was responsible to the Landtag and could be removed by a vote of no confidence. Technically, the triumvirate as a whole was the head of state and laws were signed by all three members. The chairman was in fact a first among equals whose function was unofficially equivalent to that of a minister-president, although the designation was not used.

For the entire Weimar period, the Landespräsidium consisted of members of centre-left to centre-right parties in coalition governments. A Social Democrat held the chairmanship until after the Nazis came to power in 1933.

Lippe had financial difficulties throughout the Weimar era. There were discussions about joining Prussia or creating a new mid-sized state in the region, but they came to nothing. Lippe got by financially only with help from the federal government in Berlin.

=== Nazi era ===
The last Landtag election in Lippe under the Weimar Republic was held on 15 January 1933, just two weeks before Adolf Hitler was named chancellor of Germany. Hitler himself spoke at 16 election rallies in Lippe. The results of the election put the Nazi Party in first place with 39.5% of the vote. Nazi propaganda efforts tried to exploit the election by presenting it as a great triumph in the lead-up to national Reichstag elections on 5 March. On 7 February, a new administration was formed with two Nazi members. Ernst Krappe, the economics specialist in the Nazi Party's Gau Westphalia-North, became chairman of the Landespräsidium.

On 7 April, the Reich government enacted the "Second Law on the Coordination of the States with the Reich". It established more direct control over the states by means of the powerful new position of Reichsstatthalter (Reich governor). Alfred Meyer, the Nazi Party Gauleiter for Gau Westphalia-North, was installed in the new post for both Lippe and Schaumburg-Lippe on 16 May 1933. On 23 May he appointed Hans-Joachim Riecke as state president, and when Riecke left three years later, Meyer assumed the position himself on 1 February 1936, with the title "Führer der Landesregierung" (Leader of the State Government) in addition to his Reichsstatthalter portfolio.

By the provisions of the "Law on the Reconstruction of the Reich" of 31 January 1934, all state Landtags were abolished and the sovereignty of the states passed to the Reich government. With that, Lippe de facto lost its rights as a federal state, although it continued to exist de jure as an administrative unit of the Reich until the fall of the Nazi regime.

=== Post World War II ===
After the war, Lippe was part of the British occupation zone, and the state government was restored under Heinrich Drake, the last Social Democratic leader before the Nazi takeover. Lippe lost its status as a separate German state when it was merged into the newly founded state of North Rhine-Westphalia on 21 January 1947 by British Military Government Ordinance No. 77. The British established a number of military bases in North Rhine-Westphalia, of which Detmold (headquarters and units of 20th Armoured Brigade) and Lemgo (infantry battalion barracks) were located within the former boundaries of the Free State of Lippe. North Rhine-Westphalia subsequently became a part of West Germany upon its establishment in May 1949.

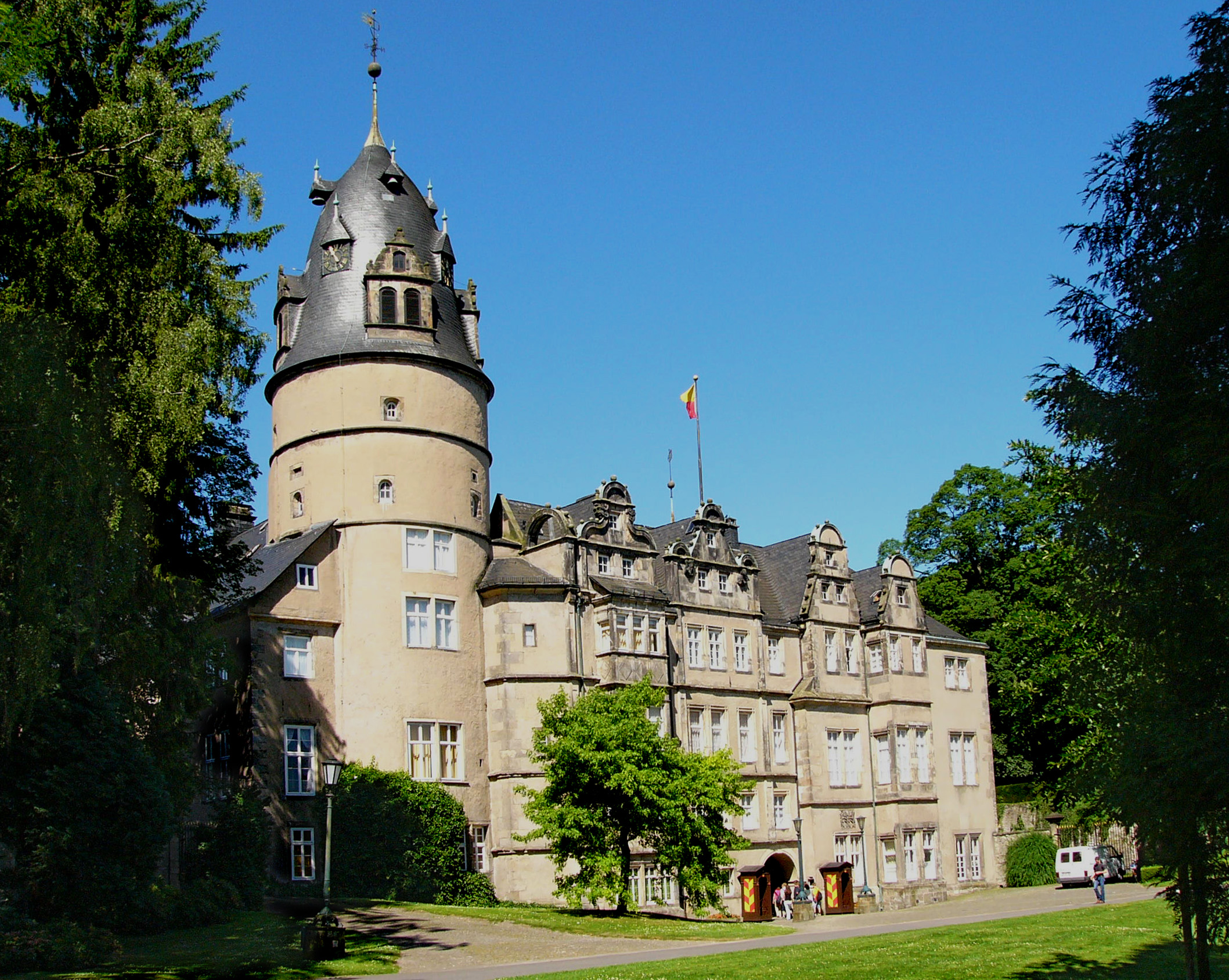
The princely castle in Detmold

=== Government leaders ===
	Name	Took office	Left office	Party
Chairmen of the Landespräsidium
1	Clemens Becker	15 November 1918	December 1920	SPD
2	Heinrich Drake	17 December 1920	7 February 1933	SPD
3	Ernst Krappe	7 February 1933	23 May 1933	NSDAP
Reichsstatthalter
	Alfred Meyer	16 May 1933	11 April 1945	NSDAP
State Presidents
4	Hans-Joachim Riecke	23 May 1933	1 February 1936	NSDAP
5	Alfred Meyer	1 February 1936	11 April 1945	NSDAP
–	Heinrich Drake	17 April 1945	21 January 1947	SPD

== See also ==
- Lippe Landtag elections in the Weimar Republic
