= Free State of Schaumburg-Lippe =

German state (1918–1946)

Free State of Schaumburg-Lippe Freistaat Schaumburg-Lippe (German)
- State of Germany
- 1918–1946
- Flag Coat of arms

- The Free State of Schaumburg-Lippe (red) within the Weimar Republic
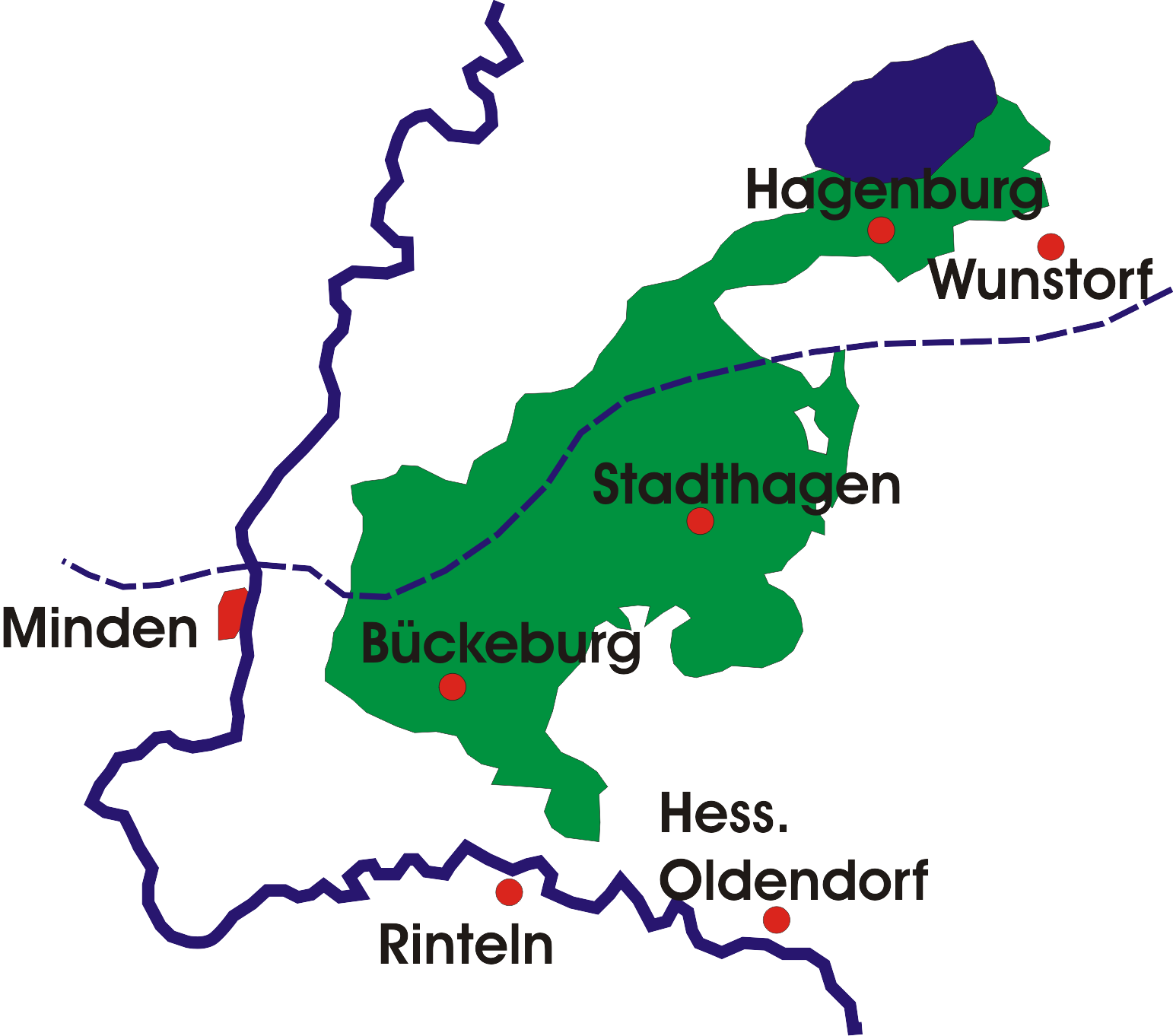
- Schaumburg-Lippe, with the Weser river to its south and west. The blue area to the north is Lake Steinhude.
- Capital: Bückeburg
- Area
  - Coordinates: 52°19′29″N 9°12′25″E
  - 1925: 340 km^{2} (130 sq mi)
- Population
  - 1925: 48,046
- Government
  - Type: Republic
- State Councillor
  - 1918 (first): Friedrich von Feilitzsch
  - 1933–1945: Karl Dreier^{a}
  - 1946 (last): Heinrich Bövers
- Reichsstatthalter
  - 1933–1945: Alfred Meyer
- Historical era: Interwar · World War II
  - German Revolution: 15 November 1918
  - Disestablished: 1 November 1946
Preceded by	Succeeded by
Principality of Schaumburg-Lippe	Lower Saxony
- Today part of: Germany
- a. As State President.

The Free State of Schaumburg-Lippe (German: Freistaat Schaumburg-Lippe) was the successor state to the Principality of Schaumburg-Lippe during the Weimar Republic and Nazi Germany. It was created in November 1918 after the German revolution brought about the collapse of the German Empire and the abdication of Schaumburg-Lippe's Prince Adolf II. The stable democratic government of the tiny Free State was suppressed in the early days of Nazi rule. After the Second World War, the British military occupation government included Schaumburg-Lippe in the new state of Lower Saxony, of which it is still a part today.

== History ==
The government of the Principality of Schaumburg-Lippe, a hereditary constitutional monarchy since 1868, consisted of a 14-member elected parliament (Landtag) with the prince acting as the executive power. With just 33,000 residents in 1881, it was the least populous state in the German Empire (1871–1918). Schaumburg-Lippe's last prince was Adolf II, who succeeded his father in 1911.

=== Revolution and Weimar Republic ===
The German revolution, which broke out in late October 1918 as World War I drew to a close, reached Schaumburg-Lippe in the first weeks of November. With workers' and soldiers' councils taking control in cities and towns across Germany, soldiers of the garrison at Bückeburg formed a council on 9 November made up of nine soldiers and five citizens. Initially it chose not to include workers among its members in order to prevent leftist groups from pushing for a soviet republic as was happening elsewhere in Germany. The council made it clear that its primary goal was to maintain order. Workers were admonished not to strike because it would make the already difficult food and supply situation worse. Bückeburg remained calm, and on 11 November, two workers were added to the council.

The council that formed in Stadthagen, called a people's and soldiers' council, was elected at a public assembly on 11 November. Although it had strong worker representation, it had no revolutionary tendencies and also saw keeping order as its main task.

The majority of Schaumburg-Lippe's residents initially preferred that Adolf II remain on the throne, and the Prince himself said that he would await a decision from a constituent national assembly about the future of Germany's monarchies. The threat of immediate forceful removal coming from revolutionary leaders in nearby Bielefeld, however, forced him to abdicate on 15 November.

A general meeting of the councils from across Schaumburg-Lippe on 28 November elected a 21-member state assembly and a 5-member executive Landesrat with Heinrich Lorenz of the moderate left Social Democratic Party (SPD) at its head. On 4 December, a government consisting of members of the SPD, the liberal German Democratic Party (DDP) and an independent formed a new government. It quickly enacted an election law which allowed all residents of the state, both male and female, who were at least 20 years old to vote in general, direct, and secret elections using proportional representation.

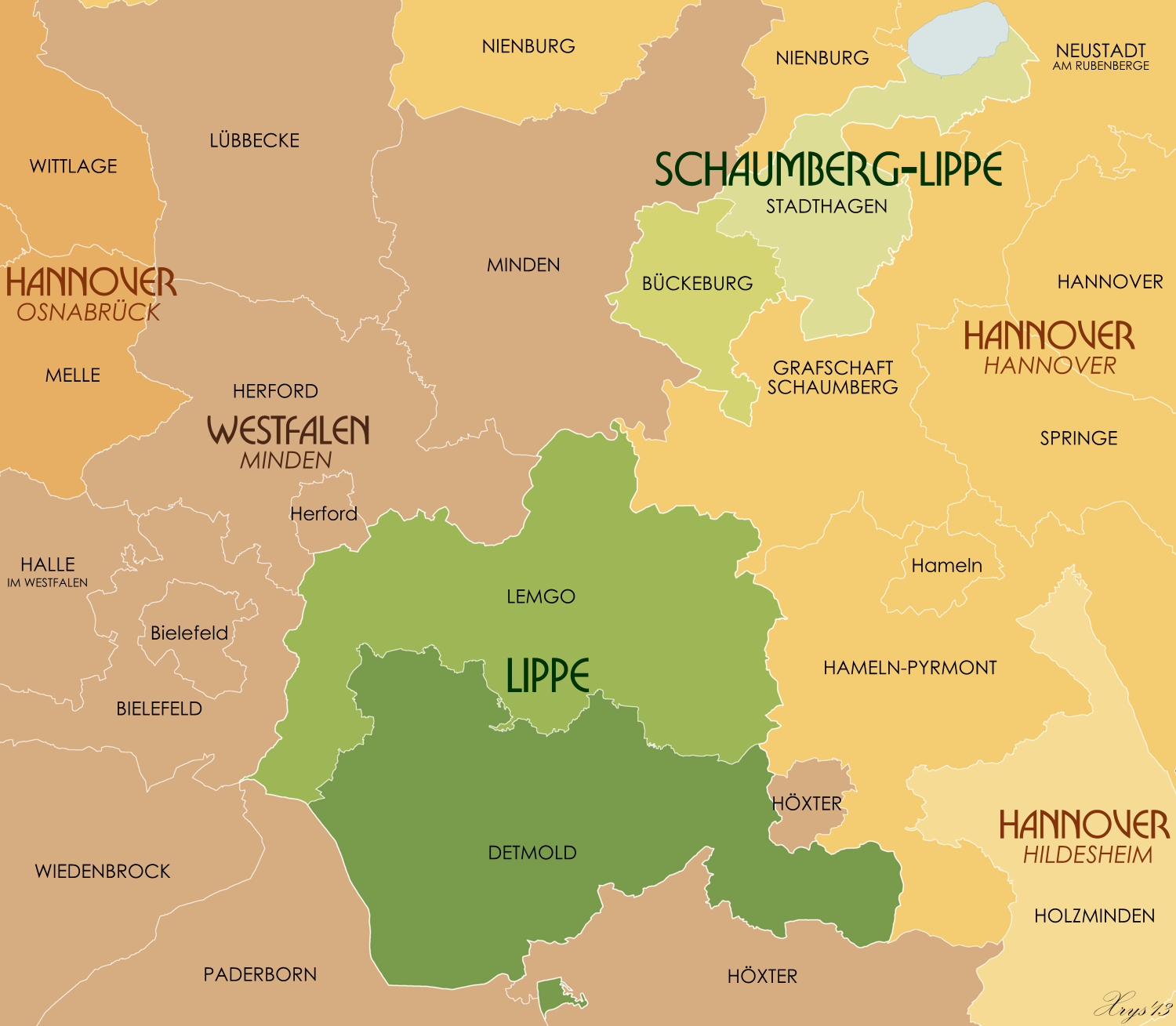
Schaumburg-Lippe (top right), showing its two administrative districts, Bückeburg and Stadthagen

The new Landtag, in which the SPD held 8 of 15 seats, passed a preliminary constitution which went into effect on 14 March 1919; the little-changed permanent constitution was enacted on 24 February 1922. Under its terms, the state parliament consisted of a Landtag of 15 members elected for a term of three years by universal suffrage. The state administration, headed by a Staatsrat (state councillor), was responsible to the Landtag and could be removed by a vote of no confidence. Until the very end of the Weimar period, the state was governed by coalitions headed by either a Social Democrat or an independent.

Uncertainty about Schaumburg-Lippe's viability as an independent state because of its small size led to a number of attempts between 1924 and 1930 to have it merge with the Free State of Prussia, which wholly surrounded it, but none of them came to fruition.

The last free election to Schaumburg-Lippe's Landtag took place on 3 May 1931. The Nazi Party took 4 of the 15 seats; the SPD remained the strongest with seven.

=== Nazi Germany ===
Following their seizure of power at the national level in January 1933, the Nazi government embarked on a policy of Gleichschaltung (coordination) by which they intended to eliminate any potential sources of opposition in the states. On 8 March 1933, Reich Interior Minister Wilhelm Frick appointed Kurt Matthaei as the Nazi Reichskommissar to take direct control of police functions in Schaumburg-Lippe. The following day the Landtag was dissolved.

The Reich government enacted the "Provisional Law on the Coordination of the States with the Reich" on 31 March 1933. It mandated that all sitting state Landtags be dissolved and reconstituted on the basis of the 5 March Reichstag election results. By that means, the Nazi Party secured a working majority in the Schaumburg-Lippe Landtag and installed Hans-Joachim Riecke as head of government on 1 April. On 7 April, the Reich government enacted the "Second Law on the Coordination of the States with the Reich". It established more direct control over the states by means of the new powerful position of Reichsstatthalter (Reich governor). Alfred Meyer, the Nazi Party Gauleiter for Gau Westphalia-North, was installed in the new post for both Schaumburg-Lippe and Lippe on 16 May 1933.

By the provisions of the "Law on the Reconstruction of the Reich" of 31 January 1934, all state Landtags were abolished and the sovereignty of the states was passed to the Reich government. With that, Schaumburg-Lippe effectively lost its rights as a federal state, although it continued to exist as an administrative unit of the Reich until the fall of the Nazi regime in 1945.

After World War II, Schaumburg-Lippe was part of the British occupation zone. It lost its status as a separate German state when it was merged into the newly founded state of Lower Saxony on 1 November 1946, which subsequently became a part of West Germany when it was established in May 1949.

== Government Leaders ==
	Name	Took office	Left office	Party
Minister of State
1	Friedrich von Feilitzsch	15 November 1918	3 December 1918	
Chairman of the State Council
2	Heinrich Lorenz	4 December 1918	14 March 1919	SPD
Minister-Presidents
3	Otto Bömers	14 March 1919	22 May 1922	Ind.
4	Konrad Wippermann	22 May 1922	28 May 1925	Ind.
5	Erich Steinbrecher	28 May 1925	7 October 1927	SPD
–	Heinrich Lorenz	7 October 1927	7 March 1933	SPD
6	Hans-Joachim Riecke	1 April 1933	23 May 1933	NSDAP
Reichsstatthalter
	Alfred Meyer	16 May 1933	11 April 1945	NSDAP
State President
7	Karl Dreier	25 May 1933	8 April 1945	NSDAP
State Councillors
8	Heinrich Bövers	May 1945	15 June 1945	Ind.
9	Heinrich Drake	15 June 1945	30 April 1946	SPD
–	Heinrich Bövers	30 April 1946	9 December 1946	Ind.

== See also ==
- Schaumburg-Lippe Landtag elections in the Weimar Republic
