= Westphalia North (electoral district) =

Former constituency of the Reichstag (Weimar Republic)

17 Westphalia North Westfalen-Nord
- Former electoral constituency for the Reichstag
- Location within the Weimar Republic
- State: Prussia
- Province: Westphalia
- Electorate: 1,146,989 (1919); 1,705,654 (1933)
- Major settlements: Gelsenkirchen, Bielefeld, Münster, Bottrop, Gladbeck, Recklinghausen, Herford

Former constituency
- Created: 1919
- Abolished: 1938

Westphalia North was one of the 35 electoral districts (German: Wahlkreise) used to elect members to the Reichstag during the Weimar Republic. It sent members to the Reichstag in nine democratic elections between 1919 and 1933. It existed nominally in the show elections to the Nazi Reichstag until 1938.

It comprised the contemporary Regierungsbezirke of Münster and Minden from the Prussian province of Westphalia, the Grafschaft Schaumburg district from the province of Hesse-Nassau, and the small states of Lippe and Schaumburg-Lippe. It was constituency 17 in the numbering scheme.

== Electoral system ==
The constituency was created for the 1919 election. Under the proportional representation electoral system of the Weimar Republic, voters cast a vote for party lists. Parties were awarded a seat for every 60,000 votes in a constituency. Excess votes were aggregated at two higher levels of seat distribution: an intermediate level combining multiple constituencies, where extra seats were awarded to parties' constituency lists, and a national level where seats were awarded to national lists of each party or alliance.

== Results (1919–1933) ==
=== Vote share ===
Party	1919	1920	1924 I	1924 II	1928	1930	1932 I	1932 II	1933
KPD		1.5	9.7	6.4	8.9	11.3	13.0	15.8	10.7
USPD	2.1	8.0	0.8	0.2					
SPD	30.6	21.9	17.8	22.0	24.4	19.8	18.0	16.9	15.6
DDP	9.8	4.7	3.6	3.5	2.5	2.1	0.3	0.3	0.3
Centre	42.1	39.6	35.8	35.6	31.5	31.5	32.9	31.9	28.7
DVP	6.6	12.5	9.5	9.7	8.3	4.8	1.3	2.0	1.2
WP				0.9	5.7	4.0	0.4	0.2	
CSVD						3.4	1.7	2.0	1.7
DNVP	8.7	10.0	14.7	16.2	9.2	5.9	5.7	7.1	6.8
Nazi			3.5	1.3	1.0	12.0	25.7	22.3	34.9
Other	0.1	1.8	4.6	4.3	8.3	5.1	1.1	1.6	0.1
Turnout	86.8	85.4	84.1	83.7	78.8	84.2	85.9	82.2	89.7
Source: Wahlen in Deutschland

=== Deputies ===
Election	Distribution	Seats
1919		13
1920		14
May 1924		15
Dec 1924		15
1928		16
1930		19
Jul 1932		22
Nov 1932		21
1933		24
Source: Wahlen in Deutschland
