= Gau Westphalia-North =

Territorial administrative unit of the NSDAP

Coordinates: 51°57′43″N 7°38′08″E

- Gau of Nazi Germany
- 1931–1945
- Flag Coat of arms

- Map of Nazi Germany showing its administrative subdivisions (Gaue and Reichsgaue)
- Capital: Münster
- Government
- Gauleiter
  - 1931–1945: Alfred Meyer
- History
  - Establishment: 1 January 1931
  - Disestablishment: 8 May 1945
Preceded by
Free State of Prussia (1933–1935)
Free State of Schaumburg-Lippe
Free State of Lippe
Succeeded by
North Rhine-Westphalia

The Gau Westphalia-North (German: Gau Westfalen-Nord) was an administrative division of Nazi Germany encompassing the Free State of Lippe, the Free State of Schaumburg-Lippe and the northern half of the Prussian province of Westphalia between 1933 and 1945. From 1931 to 1933, it was the regional subdivision of the Nazi Party for these areas.

== History ==
The Nazi Gau (plural Gaue) system was originally established in a party conference on 22 May 1926, in order to improve administration of the party structure. From 1933 onward, after the Nazi seizure of power, the Gaue increasingly replaced the German states as administrative subdivisions in Germany.

At the head of each Gau stood a Gauleiter, a position which became increasingly more powerful, especially after the outbreak of the Second World War, with little interference from above. Local Gauleiter often held government positions as well as party ones and were in charge of, among other things, propaganda and surveillance and, from September 1944 onward, the Volkssturm and the defense of the Gau.

The position of Gauleiter in Westphalia-North was held by Alfred Meyer from its formation until his suicide on 11 April 1945. nine days after the Gau's capital, Münster, was captured. Meyer's Deputy Gauleiter was Peter Stangier, the sole holder of this post, who was appointed in August 1931 and remained in office until the collapse of the regime in May 1945.

=== Allied invasion and occupation ===
Near the end of World War II, the Gau was invaded by the western allies, who would gradually capture its territory until the end of the war. The timeline of the allied advance is detailed in the table below.

Date of capture	Location	Ref
28 March 1945	Raesfeld	
28 March 1945	Borken	
28 March 1945	Haltern am See	
30 March 1945	Bocholt	
30 March 1945	Ahaus	
30 March 1945	Gescher	
30 March 1945	Rhede	
30 March 1945	Coesfeld	
30 March 1945	Lager Herbstwald	
30 March 1945	Buldern	
31 March 1945	Vreden	
31 March 1945	Burgsteinfurt	
1-3 April 1945	Ochtrup	
1 April 1945	Lüdinghausen	
2 April 1945	Gronau	
2 April 1945	Datteln	
2 April 1945	Münster	
