= Heinrich Drake =

German politician

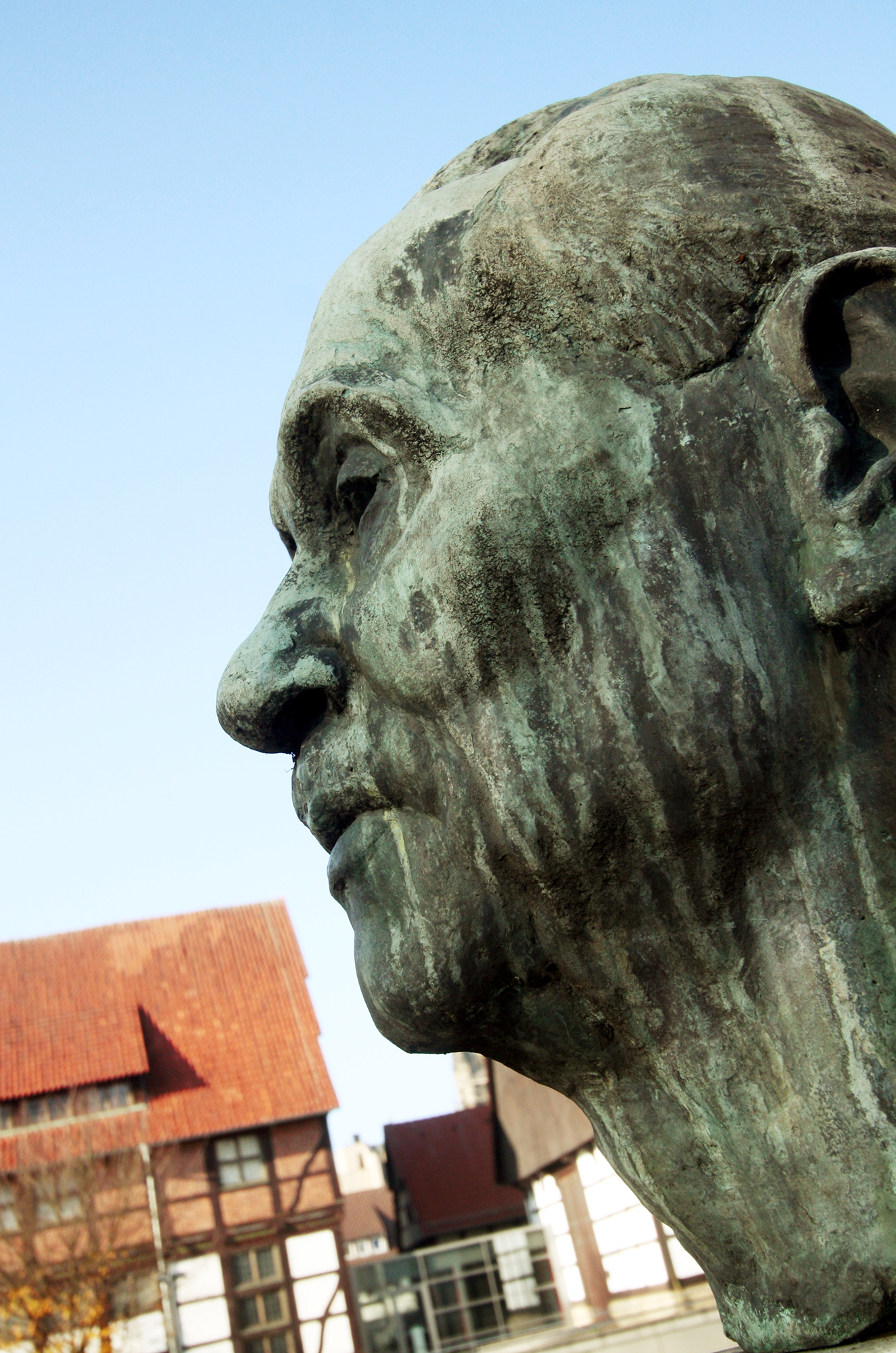
Statue of Heinrich Drake

Heinrich Drake (20 December 1881 – 12 June 1970) was a German politician (SPD). He was President of the Free State of Lippe from 1925 to 1933 and again from 1945 to 1947, until Lippe was incorporated into the new state of North Rhine-Westphalia. For a short period in 1945/46, he also served as President of the neighbouring state of Schaumburg-Lippe, which later became part of Lower Saxony. He was born in Lemgo and died in Detmold. He had regular correspondence with Gottfried Reinhold Treviranus, the former chairman of the Conservative People's Party.
