= Reich Ministry for the Occupied Eastern Territories =

Government agency in Nazi Germany

- Reichsministerium für die besetzten Ostgebiete

Agency overview
- Formed: 17 July 1941; 85 years ago
- Dissolved: 5 May 1945; 81 years ago
- Jurisdiction: Government of Nazi Germany
- Headquarters: Unter den Linden 63, Berlin (Note: Rauchstraße 17/18, Berlin (until June 1942) Unter den Linden 63, Berlin (until May 1945). It was and is still the Russian Embassy in Berlin); 52°31′12″N 13°24′18″E
- Reichsminister responsible: Alfred Rosenberg
- Deputy responsible: Alfred Meyer

The Reich Ministry for the Occupied Eastern Territories (RMfdbO; German: Reichsministerium für die besetzten Ostgebiete), commonly known as the Ostministerium, (pronounced [ˈɔstminɪsˌteːʁiʊm]; "Eastern Ministry") was a ministry of Nazi Germany responsible for occupied territories in the Baltic states and Soviet Union from 1941 to 1945. Alfred Rosenberg served as Reichsminister with Alfred Meyer as his deputy during its existence.

The Ostministerium was created by Adolf Hitler shortly after the German invasion of the Soviet Union to control the vast areas captured and projected for capture by the Wehrmacht in the Baltic states, Belarus, Ukraine, and Russia. Two Reichskommissariats were established: Ostland and Ukraine, while two more were planned, Moskowien and Kaukasien, but the Wehrmacht never established firm possession of the areas designated and German civilian control never developed there. The Ostministerium was involved in the development and implementation of Generalplan Ost, which fell under its jurisdiction, along with the Reich Commission for the Consolidation of German Nationhood, the Reich Security Main Office, and the SS Race and Settlement Main Office. It was one of the main agencies that oversaw the Holocaust in the Soviet Union.

== History ==
Sleeve insignia of the civil service of the diplomatic corps of the Reich Ministry for the Occupied Eastern Territories (Uniform der Ostbeamten)

The origins of the Ostministerium can be traced to 3 March 1941, when Adolf Hitler announced for the first time to the High Command of the Wehrmacht (OKW) that he planned to set up an "Eastern Ministry". The announcement was made in a conversation with Wilhelm Keitel when they were discussing plans for what would become Operation Barbarossa, the invasion of the Soviet Union. Hitler considered the political tasks in the occupied eastern territories would be too difficult to be left to the Wehrmacht. On 26 March 1941, Reinhard Heydrich wrote a note about a conversation with Reichsmarshall Hermann Göring, suggesting that responsibility for such a ministry should be given to Alfred Rosenberg, the Nazi Party's chief racial theorist and a Baltic German. Shortly afterwards, the Reich Chancellery informed the Reichsministers that all measures in the Eastern European territories had to be coordinated with Rosenberg. On 2 April 1941, Rosenberg had an extended conversation with Hitler about the "military and human psyche of the Russians", which resulted in an informal invitation to head and prepare the theoretical eastern ministry.

On 22 June 1941, Nazi Germany invaded the Soviet Union and proceeded rapidly into the country. By December, the Germans would manage to conquer 1,600,000 square kilometres (600,000 sq mi) of Soviet territory.

On 17 July 1941, the Ostministerium was established by Hitler with Rosenberg as its Reichsminister, though its creation was not officially announced to the public until November. Alfred Meyer served as his deputy and later represented him at the Wannsee Conference. Rosenberg presented a plan to Hitler for the organization of the conquered territories, suggesting the establishment of new administrative districts to replace the previously Soviet-controlled territories with new Reichskommissariats. These would be:

- Ostland (Baltic countries and Belarus),
- Ukraine (Ukraine and nearest territories),
- Kaukasien (The Caucasus),
- Moskowien (Moscow and surrounding areas of European Russia)

Ostland was established immediately after the ministry's founding and placed under the command of Reichskommissar Hinrich Lohse. Ukraine was established on 20 August 1941 and placed under the command of Reichskommissar Erich Koch. Moskowien and Kaukasien were planned but never established as the Wehrmacht failed to reach A–A line, only conquering parts of those regions and unable to maintain control that was stable enough for civil authority.

Rosenberg's plans were intended to win over the non-Jewish populations of the conquered territories, for the sake of minimising anti-German resistance if nothing else, and wished to portray the Germans as liberators from Soviet domination. A program of land reform was promulgated in February 1942, that included promises of decollectivization through the abolition of kolkhozes, and the re-distribution of land to peasants for individual farming. Rosenberg's plans and authority were routinely undermined, from both above and below, with little of it being actualised as intended. Decollectivization conflicted with the wider demands of wartime food production, and Göring demanded that the collective farms be retained, save for a change of name. Hitler himself denounced the redistribution of land as "stupid". When the Wehrmacht progressed east, the SS and its collaborationist Auxiliary Police filled the resulting power vacuum by acting as it wished, often committing crimes against non-Jewish population. Hitler ordered Koch to take a hard and brutal approach in Ukraine, which helped to push potential Ukrainian allies back to the Allied camp, substantially undermining Rosenberg's authority. Furthermore, the Ostministerium was denied authority over army and other security formations within the occupied territories.

By late 1944, the Ostministerium became obsolete as the eastern territories were reconquered by the Red Army, though it continued to formally exist until it was abolished by the Flensburg Government on 5 May 1945.

== Uniform and rank insignia ==
Ministry employees wore brown uniforms of the same type as NSDAP and SA functionaries, but with a dark brown collar.

Collar tabs: burgundy (dark red) for general district (Generalbezirk) commissariats; orange-red for local district (Gebiet) commissariats; crimson for the Reich Commissariat; and light red for ministerial-level officials.

Rank was indicated by small four-pointed stars of a special format (different from the Wehrmacht, SS, and other paramilitary formations of Nazi Germany), as well as a piping or border of oak leaves along the edge:

- Junior employees (equivalent to soldier ranks) - collar tabs with a thin piping (clear or with one star)
- Senior employees (equivalent to sergeant ranks) - collar tabs with a white and silver border along the piping (clear or from one to three stars)
- Junior command staff (equivalent to the ranks of lieutenant to Hauptmann) - white and silver pairs of oak leaves in the four corners of the collar tab (clear or from one to four stars; up to three stars were arranged vertically, four stars were in a diamond shape)
- Senior command staff (equivalent to the ranks of major to colonel) - white and silver border of oak leaves Leaves (blank or from one to four stars; up to three stars were arranged vertically, four stars were arranged in a diamond shape)
- Senior leadership: a gold-embroidered frame of a double row of oak leaves (blank or from one to three stars)
- Minister and territorial commissioners: a gold-embroidered frame of a double row of oak leaves (Minister: a large eagle with lowered wings; Deputy Minister or Reich Commissioner: a small eagle with lowered wings and a star beneath it; General Commissioner: a small eagle)

All ranks wore identical false shoulder straps made of the same fabric as the overcoat (uniform) without insignia.

On the left sleeve was an eagle with outstretched wings, on the cap was a brass (or white-embroidered) eagle with outstretched wings (larger than those in the Wehrmacht or SS) and a cockade framed by a large number of brass (or white-embroidered) oak leaves. The buttons bore an eagle with drooping wings.

Collar insignia	RMBO Rank	Translation
A large square oak wreath with a large eagle in the center	Reichsminister	Reich minister
A square wreath of two rows of golden oak leaves, a small eagle and a star below it	Vertreter des Reichsministers	Representative of the Reichsminister
A square wreath of two rows of golden oak leaves, a small eagle in the center	Reichskommissar	Reich commissioner
A square wreath of two rows of golden oak leaves, 3 stars arranged vertically	Hauptabteilungsleiter im Ministerium	Head of department in the ministry
A square wreath of two rows of golden oak leaves, 2 stars arranged vertically	Generalkommissar, Landesverwaltung Präsident	Commissioner-general, Regional administration president
A square wreath of two rows of golden oak leaves, one star	Ministerialdirigent	Ministerial director
A square wreath of two rows of golden oak leaves	Vertreter des Generalkommissars	Representative of the commissioner general
A square wreath of silver oak leaves, 4 stars arranged in a lozenge shape	Ministerialrat, Landesdirektor, Bezirksdirektor, Gebietshauptkommissar	Councilor, Country director, District director, Area chief commissioner
A square wreath of silver oak leaves, 3 stars arranged vertically	Dirigent, Landesdirigent, Bezirksdirigent, Gebietskommissar	Conductor, Country conductor, District conductor, Area commissioner
A square wreath of silver oak leaves, 2 stars arranged vertically	Oberregierungsrat, Landesoberrat, Bezirksoberrat, Gebietsoberrat	Senior government councilor, Senior country councilor, Senior district councilor, Senior area councilor
A square wreath of silver oak leaves, 1 star	Regierungsrat, Landesrat, Bezirksrat, Gebietsrat	Government councilor, Country councilor, District councilor, Area councilor
A square wreath of silver oak leaves	Regierungsassessor, Landesassessor, Bezirksassessor	Government Assessor, State Assessor, District Assessor
4 pairs of silver oak leaves in the corners, 4 stars arranged in a lozenge shape	Amtsrat, Landesamtsrat, Bezirksamtsrat	Senior Administrative Officer, State Administrative Officer, District Administrative Officer
4 pairs of silver oak leaves in the corners, 3 stars arranged vertically	Regierungsamtmann, Landesamtmann, Bezirksamtmann, Gebietsreferent	Government official, state official, district official, regional officer
4 pairs of silver oak leaves in the corners, 2 stars arranged vertically	Regierungsoberinspektor, Landesoberinspektor, Bezirksoberinspektor, Gebietsoberinspektor	Senior government inspector, senior state inspector, senior district inspector, senior regional inspector
4 pairs of silver oak leaves in the corners, 1 star	Regierungsinspektor, Landesinspektor, Bezirksinspektor, Gebietsinspektor	Government inspector, state inspector, district inspector, regional inspector
4 pairs of silver oak leaves in the corners	Inspektorenanwärter und a.p. Inspektor	Inspector candidate and a.p. inspector
A white ribbon frame, 3 stars arranged vertically	Regierungsobersekretär, Landesobersekretär, Bezirksobersekretär, Gebietsobersekretär	Senior Government Secretary, State Secretary, District Secretary, Area Secretary
A white ribbon frame, 2 stars arranged vertically	Regierungssekretar, Landessekretar, Bezirkssekretar, Gebietssekretar / Postassistent	Government Secretary, State Secretary, District Secretary, Area Secretary / Post assistant
A white ribbon frame, 1 star	Verwaltungassisstent, Landesassistent, Bezirksassistent, Gebietsassistent / Postassistenthelfer	Administrative Assistant, State Assistant, District Assistant, Territory Assistant / Post assistant candidate
A white ribbon frame	Assistentenanwärter / Postanwärter	Assistant candidate / Post candidate
One star	Betriebsassistent, Landesbetriebsassistent, Bezirksbetriebsassistent, Gebietsbetriebsassistent / Postbote	Operations assistant, state operations assistant, district operations assistant, area operations assistant / Postman
Blank	Betriebsassistent a. Pr. / Posthilfsbote	Probationary Operations Assistant / Assistant postman

== See also ==
- "Decollectivization" under German occupation
- Foreign Armies East (Nazi intelligence service focusing on territory to the East)
- Gerhard von Mende
- The Holocaust in the Soviet Union
