= Reichsminister =

German ministers 1848–1849 / 1919–1945

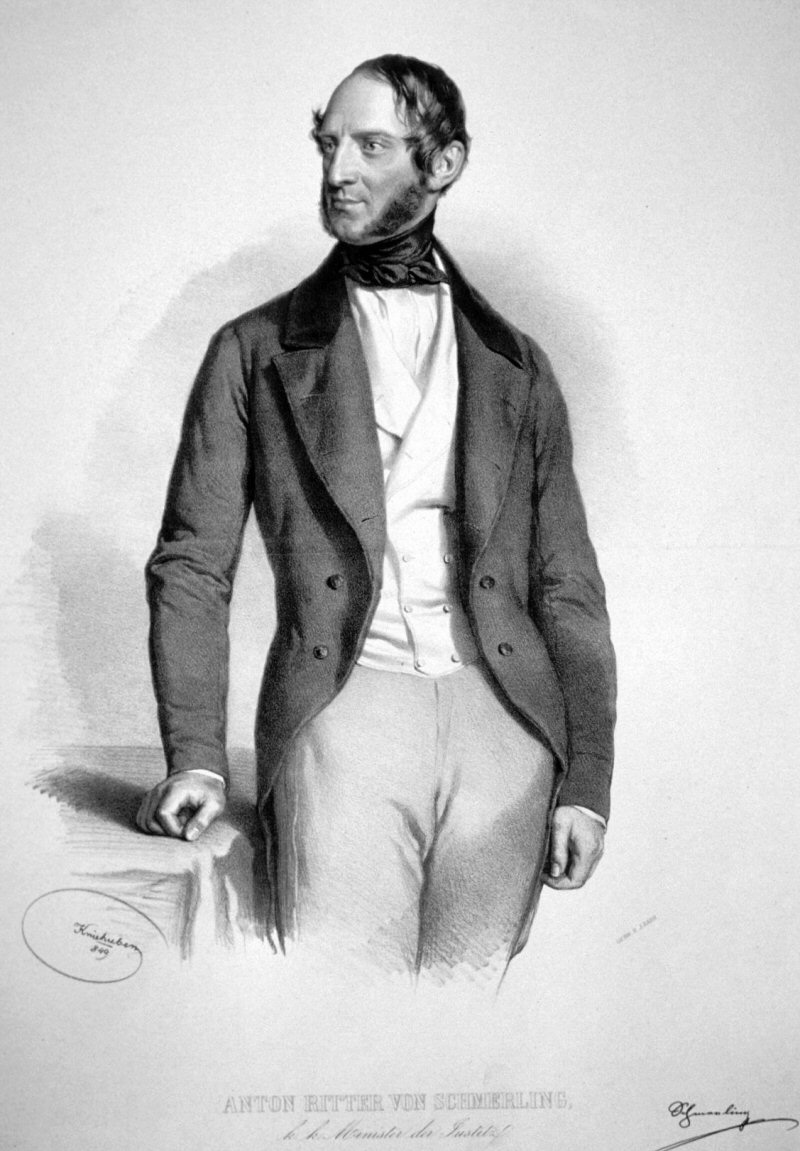
Anton von Schmerling from Austria: on July 15, 1848 he belonged to the first three men that the Reichsverweser installed as German Reichsminister.

Reichsminister (in German singular and plural; 'minister of the realm') was the title of members of the German Government during two historical periods: during the March Revolution of 1848/1849 in the German Reich of that period, and in the modern German federal state from 1919 to the end of the Nazi regime in 1945.

"Reich" was the name of the German federal state from 1871 to 1945: Deutsches Reich. In English, it is translated to "empire" (for the period with an Emperor), and often left untranslated for the time after. A Reichsminister was a member of the national government, not to be confused with a member of a government of one of the many Länder (states) of Germany.

The Holy Roman Empire that existed until 1806 did not have a modern government and thus no ministers.

In German, the word Reichsminister may refer in rare cases to a minister of a different country, such as a Danish rigsminister or a Dutch rijksminister.

== Revolution 1848/1849 ==
In 1848, the first parliament for all of Germany, the National Assembly (or Frankfurt parliament in English), voted for a provisional constitutional order. It also installed a Reichsverweser as a kind of provisional head of state. The Reichsverweser had the task of installing the ministers. The Reichsverweser and the Reichsminister together formed the Provisorische Zentralgewalt (provisional central power, also called imperial government). The Reichsminister together met as the Ministerrat or Gesamt-Reichsministerium. Although not mentioned in the constitutional order, usually one of the Reichsminister held the title of Ministerpräsident.

== German federal state since 1867 ==
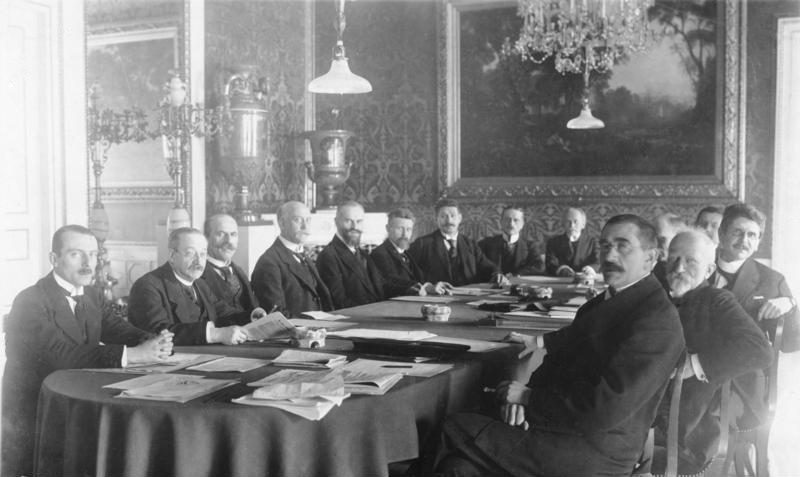
The first German cabinet after the revolution, February 1919, with Reichsministerpräsident Philipp Scheidemann

When the North German Confederation (1867) and the German Empire (1871) were created, the chancellor (Bundeskanzler, then Reichskanzler) was the only responsible member of government. The chancellor installed heads of the governmental departments with the title of a Staatssekretär. They developed into de facto ministers, but they were officially not colleagues of the chancellor.

In the revolution of 1918/1919, the National Assembly of Weimar similarly agreed first on a provisional constitutional order (February 1919). A Reichspräsident installed ministers; one of them used the title Reichsministerpräsident in practice. The Weimar Constitution of August 1919 introduced the title of Reichskanzler again, now with Reichsminister (plural) as his colleague. The National Socialists did not change the titles after 1933, albeit the official cabinet government lost some of its significance due to Hitler installing numerous other office holders with similar tasks. The last Reichsminister (plural) were imprisoned by Allied forces in May 1945 ('Flensburg Government').

In the German constitution of 1949, the German government consists of the Bundeskanzler and the Bundesminister.
