= List of songs about Berlin =

This list of songs about Berlin is an addition to the main article Music in Berlin and contains any songs about or involving the city of Berlin.

== Up to 1945 ==
Year	Artist	Song	Lyric	Notes
c.1820	Berliner Volksmund	Denkste denn, du Berliner Pflanze		Music: Marsch aus Petersburg
	Claire Waldoff	An de Panke – an de Wuhle – an de Spree	"Die Großstadtpflanze", "Emilie vom Kurfürstendamm", "Es gibt nur ein Berlin", "Im Nußbaum links vom Molkenmarkt", "In Tegel gibts lockere Vögel", "Wat braucht der Berliner um glücklich zu sein"	
1889	Oskar Klein	Der Rixdorfer		a.k.a. In Rixdorf ist Musike; Music: Eugen Phillipi
c.1890	Titto Manowitz	Im Grunewald ist Holzauktion		
c.1900	Folk song	Bolle reiste jüngst zu Pfingsten		
1904	Paul Lincke	Berliner Luft	"Nach der Liebesinsel laß uns gehn", "Das ist der Zauber von Berlin"	
c.1913	Otto Reutter	Berlin is ja so groß		
	Walter Kollo	Untern Linden	"Das war in Schöneberg im Monat Mai"	
1928	Kurt Weill	Berlin im Licht		
1942	Ozzie Waters	A Rodeo Down in Tokyo and a Round Up in Old Berlin		
1943	Frank Sinatra	(There'll Be A) Hot Time In The Town Of Berlin		
1943	Bing Crosby & The Andrews Sisters	Hot Time in the Town of Berlin		
1944	Leonid Utesov	Дорога на Берлин		Trans: The Road to Berlin
1940s	Jack Little	I've Always Wanted to Dance in Berlin		

== From 1945 to 1989 ==
Year	Artist	Song	Lyric	Notes
1951	Conny Froboess	Pack die Badehose ein	"Und dann nischt wie raus nach Wannsee"	
1952	Gina Presgott	Pack die Badehose ein		DDR satiric version
1952	Gerhard Wendland	Heimweh nach dir		
1952	Fred Oldörp (Die 3 Travellers)	Kleiner Bär von Berlin		
	Schöneberger Sängerknaben (Schöneberg Boys' Choir)	Berliner Jungens, die sind richtig Grüße aus Berlin; Jetzt ist der Himmel blau in Berlin; Parole: Treffpunkt Zoo; Uns're Stadt hört doch nicht am Brandenburger Tor auf		
	Hildegard Knef	Berlin, dein Gesicht hat Sommersprossen; Das ist Berlin; Heimweh nach dem Kurfürstendamm; Ich hab noch einen Koffer in Berlin		
	Ernst Busch	Roter Wedding	"Der Wedding kommt wieder, Berlin bleibt rot damit Deutschland den Deutschen gehört"	
1963	Édith Piaf	L'homme de Berlin		
1964	Günter Pfitzmann	An die Berlinerin		
1966	Gerd Natschinski	Zeig mir mal Berlin		From the "Musikalisches Lustspiel" Servus Peter
1967	Spencer Davis Group	Det war in Schöneberg		
1969	Heidi Bruhl	Berlin		
1969	Bob Telden	Berlin erwacht		
	Medium-Terzett	Spree-Walzer		
1971	Stephen Sondheim	Ah, Paris!	"New York has neon, Berlin has bars but ah! Paris!"	
1972	Ton Steine Scherben	Rauch-Haus-Song		
1973	Lou Reed	Berlin		
1973	Wizz Jones	When I leave Berlin		
1977	PVC	Berlin by Night		
1977	Iggy Pop	Lust For Life		
1977	Iggy Pop	The Passenger		
1977	Karussell	Kleine Freundin aus Schönefeld		
1977	Lone Star	Bells of Berlin		
1977	Sex Pistols	Holidays in the Sun	"I'm gonna go over the Berlin Wall, I don't understand this thing at all"	
1977	David Bowie	Neuköln		Inspired by Neukölln area of Berlin
1978	Barclay James Harvest	Berlin		
1978	Japan	Suburban Berlin		
1978	Gebrüder Blattschuss	Kreuzberger Nächte		
1978	Klaus Hoffmann	Berlin; Was fang ich an in dieser Stadt		
1979	Japan	Halloween	"Slowly emerging, dividing Germany, everyone's lost in East Berlin"	
1979	Bel Ami	Berlin bei Nacht		
1979	Widows	Wall of Berlin		
1979	DAF (Deutsch Amerikanische Freundschaft)	Kebabträume		
1980	Ideal	Berlin		
1980	Geile Tiere	Berlin Nite		
1980	Billy Branch and Lurrie Bell	Berlin Wall		
1981	Einstürzende Neubauten	Steh auf Berlin		
1981	Fischer-Z	Berlin		
1981	KFC (Kriminalitätsförderungsclub)	Stille Tage in Ost-Berlin		
1982	Mobiles	Drowning in Berlin		
1982	Herman Brood	Berlin schmerzt		
1982	Leinemann	Treffpunkt Berlin		
1982	Milva	Alexanderplatz		
1982	Rational Youth	Dancing on the Berlin Wall		
1982	UKW	Sommersprossen		
1982	Tom Robinson	Tango An Der Wand		
1982	Lilli Berlin	Ost-Berlin Wahnsinn		
1983	Udo Lindenberg	Sonderzug nach Pankow; Gummi in Berlin; Ich hab noch einen Koffer in Berlin; In den Ruinen von Berlin; Mädchen aus Ostberlin; Seid willkommen in Berlin; Russen		
1983	Pooh	Lettera da Berlino Est		
1983	Savage	Berlin		
	Wolf Biermann	Berlin; Frühling auf dem Mont Klamott		
	Helga Hahnemann	Berlin; Berlin, meine Liebe; Hundert mal Berlin; Hätt ick man lieber (Ode einer Berlinerin)		
1984	Klein Orkest	Over de Muur (Über die Mauer)		
1984	Bajaga i instruktori	Berlin		
1984	Camel	West Berlin		
1984	Alphaville	Summer in Berlin		
	Marius Müller-Westernhagen	Berlin		
	Nina Hagen	Berlin; Berlin is dufte Aufm Bahnhof Zoo		
	Reinhard Mey	Berlin tut weh Mein Berlin; Aber zuhaus' kann ich nur in Berlin sein Zwischen Kiez und Kudamm; Ich trag' den Staub von deinen Straßen		
1985	Klaus Hoffmann	Tegel		
1985	Paganini	Berlin by Night		
1985	Rainhard Fendrich	Frühling in Berlin		
1986	Birger Heymann and Volker Ludwig	Linie 1		A musical about a subway-line in Berlin
1986	The Hush	Dancing in East Berlin		
1987	City	Wand an Wand; Der King vom Prenzlauer Berg; Z.B. Susann (Berlin)		
1987	John F. und die Gropiuslerchen	Berlin, Berlin (...dein Herz kennt keine Mauern)		
1987	Jennifer Warnes	First We Take Manhattan	"First we take Manhattan, then we take Berlin"	
1987	Wild Dogs	Streets of Berlin		
1987	Shy	Break Down the Walls		
1988	Leonard Cohen	First We Take Manhattan		
1988	Marillion	Berlin		
1988	Kult	Arahja		
1989	Franco Battiato	Alexander Platz		
1989	Silly	Mont Klamott; Verlorene Kinder; Berliner Frühling; Halloween in Ostberlin; Heiße Würstchen		
1989	Oktoberklub	Spreeathen		
1989	Peter Schilling	City Of Night		
1989	John F. und die Gropiuslerchen	Berlin, Berlin (Mauerfall-Version)		
1989	Kombi	Pamiętaj mnie (Remember me)		

== Since 1989 ==
- Die Skeptiker – Berlin • Dada in Berlin
- Rio Reiser – Sonnenallee (1990)
- Reinhard Mey – Mein Berlin (1990)
- They Might Be Giants – Road Movie to Berlin (1990)
- Ketil Stokkan – Brandenburger Tor (1990)
- Big Cyc – Berlin Zachodni (West Berlin), (1990)
- U2 – Zoo Station (1991)
- Klaus Hoffmann - Stein auf Stein (1991)
- Harald Juhnke – Berlin, Berlin (1992)
- Puhdys – Wie ein Engel (S-Bahn-Surver) (1992)
- Kurt Schulzke – Der Bär kommt aus Berlin (1992)
- Mão Morta – Berlim (Morreu a Nove) (1992)
- U2 – Stay, faraway so close! (1993)
- Vicki Vomit – Sommer in Berlin (1994)
- Second Decay – I Hate Berlin (1994)
- Pink Floyd – A Great Day for Freedom (1994)
- Guildo Horn – Berlin
- The Ramones – Born to Die in Berlin (1995)
- Nepper Schlepper Schlechte Rapper – Sommer in Berlin (Sony/1996)
- Udo Lindenberg – Der frische Wind von Berlin (1996)
- Robbie Williams – Berliner Star
- Eberhart Schoener, Die Prinzen und Solisten des Tölzer Knabenchores – Potsdamer Platz (Herz von Berlin) (1998)
- Klaus Hoffmann – Stadt ohne Namen (1998)
- Funny van Dannen – Berlin International (1999) • Urbanhafen (1996)
- Element of Crime – Jung und Schön (1999) • Alle vier Minuten (2001)
- Quetschenpaua – Q-Damm's Börnin' (1998)
- Die Sterne – Big in Berlin (1999)
- Juan María Solare - Helmholtz-Straßen Blues (1999)
- Surrogat – Berlin liebt Dich (2000)
- Keimzeit – Berlin (2000)
- Harleckinz – Berlin Love (2000)
- Ute Lemper – Streets of Berlin (2000)
- Einstürzende Neubauten – Die Befindlichkeit des Landes (2000)
- Paula – Die Stadt
- Scarface – Willkommen in Berlin
- Reinhard Mey – Serefina (2000)
- Midnight Choir – Snow in Berlin (2000)
- Briskeby – Berlin (2000)
- Olaf Schubert – Berlin (bzw. Berlin, wo gehts du hin? 2000)
- Britta – Die traurigsten Menschen (von ganz Berlin) (2001)
- Die Prinzen – Berlin (2001)
- Seeed – Dickes B (2001) • Music Monks (2003) • Schwinger (2005)
- Die Ärzte – Westberlin (2001)
- Ellen Allien – Stadtkind (2001)
- Dritte Wahl – Fasching in Berlin (2002)
- Basta – Berlin (2002)
- Kleingeldprinzessin und die Stadtpiraten – Öffentlicher Nahverkehr (2002)
- Lexy & K-Paul – Der Fernsehturm (2002)
- New York – Willkommen in Berlin (2002)
- Rosenstolz – Tag in Berlin (November) (2002)
- Rocko Schamoni – Berlin Woman (2002)
- City – Berlin 2 (2002)
- Bushido – Berlin (2003)
- Angelika Express – Geh doch nach Berlin (2003)
- Ben – Wir steh'n auf (2003)
- Ian Anderson – Pigeons Flying Over Berlin Zoo (2003)
- Kaiserbase – Berlin, du bist so wunderbar (2003)
- Martin Kesici – Angel of Berlin (2003)
- P. R. Kantate – Görli Görli (2003)
- Culcha Candela – In da city (2004)
- Donato Plögert – Berlin is pleite (2004)
- Fischer-Z – Back to Berlin (2004)
- Jeans Team – Berlin am Meer (2004)
- Rainald Grebe – Miriam (du Blume aus Marzahn) (2004)
- Willy Astor – Berlien, wa! (2004)
- Sido – Berlin Berlin feat. Harris • Westberlin • Mein Block (2004)
- Patrouille – Ruhleben (2004)
- Toni Kater – Berlin (2004)
- BAP – Unger Linde enn Berlin (2004)
- Virginia Jetzt! – Der Himmel über Berlin (2004)
- Wise Guys – Hallo Berlin (2004)
- Taktloss – Westberlin Jungle (2004)
- Rainhard Fendrich – Berlin (2004)
- City – Meine Gegend (2004)
- Boudewijn de Groot – "Unter den Linden" • "Berlijn" (2004)
- Fler – Willkommen in Berlin feat. Sido, B-Tight, Frauenarzt, Megaloh, MC Bogy, Tony D & Shizoe (2005)
- The 69 Eyes – Feel Berlin (2005)
- Bullit – Grimecity • Mittegirl (2005)
- Carpark North – Berlin (2005)
- Sentino – Berlin (2005)
- Der Automat – Trabrennbahn (2005)
- Mach One, Tarek (von K.I.Z), Muerte/Massimo – Willkommen in 361 (2005)
- Rainald Grebe – Brandenburg (song is called Brandenburg but contrasts the differences between the desolate state and the busy city of Berlin, 2005)
- Wohlstandskinder – Deine Nacht über Berlin (2005)
- Nordstrøm – Berlin (2006)
- MC Bogy – Willkommen in Abschaumcity (2006)
- Sera Finale – Berlin (2006)
- Prinz Pi – Würfel • Willkommen in der Hauptstadt • Das ist Berlin (feat. 82EE) (2005) • Berlin – Grosse Liebe • Meene Stadt (feat. Frank Zander) (2006) • Wir ficken die Welt (2009) • Zu Hause (2011)
- Max Herre – King vom Prenzlauer Berg
- Roger Cicero – So geil Berlin
- Rasta Knast – Ost-Berlin
- Fler – Ich scheine (2006)
- Kleingeldprinzessin und die Stadtpiraten – Der Kanal (2006)
- MIA. – Je dis aime/Ich sag Liebe (2006)
- Botanica – "Berlin HiFi" (2006)
- Sender Freie Rakete – Istanbulberlin (2006)
- TempEau – Du bist verrückt mein Kind (Bang City) (2006)
- Nils Heinrich (Brauseboys) – Angeln Berlin (2006)
- Marsimoto – "Green Berlin" (2006)
- Lisi – "Berlin" (2006)
- Kim Frank – Berlin (2007)
- Fler – Berlin Flair • Berlin Zoo (feat. Massiv) (2007)
- Patroulle – Und am Prenzlauer Berg herrscht die Angst vorm Versagen (2007)
- Bloc Party – Kreuzberg (2007)
- Rufus Wainwright – Tiergarten (2007)
- Kante – Wer hierher kommt, will vor die Tür • Die große alte neue Stadt (2007)
- Tele – Bye Bye Berlin (2007)
- Infernal – From Paris to Berlin
- B-Tight – "Zack Zack" (2007)
- P.R. Kantate – In Balin (2007)
- Jahcoozi – BLN (2007)
- Icke & Er – Keen Hawaii (2007)
- Panda – Hierbleiben (2007)
- Black Rebel Motorcycle Club – Berlin (2007)
- Beirut – Prenzlauer berg (2007)
- Kat Frankie – Berlin Cops (2007)
- Kent – Berlin (2007)
- Genepool – Berlin By Night (2007)
- Trikot – Wasser aus der Spree (2008)
- Peter Fox – Fieber, Schwarz zu blau (2008)
- Illdisposed – Verloren in Berlin (2008)
- Robots in Disguise – I Live in Berlin (2008)
- Fler – Berlin (2008)
- Sugarplum Fairy – In Berlin (2008)
- Mario Barth – Mensch Berlin (2008) (zusammen mit Paul Kuhn)
- In Extremo – Berlin (2008)
- The Mountain Goats – Marduk T-shirt Men's Room Incident (2008)
- Why? – "The Hollows" (2008)
- Sven van Thom – Jaqueline (Ich hab Berlin gekauft) (2008)
- Hecklah und Coch – Berlin (2008)
- Christophe Willem – Berlin (2009)
- Tony D – Meine Gang (2009)
- Elektrohoden – Hey hey schöner Szenetyp (2009)
- Moderat – Berlin (2009)
- Ludovico Einaudi – Berlin Song (2009)
- Antoine Villoutreix – Berlin (2010)
- Culcha Candela – Berlin city girl (2011)
- Modeselektor – Berlin (2011)
- Mark Tarmonea – So Berlin – Freddy Verano Remix (2014)
- Kraftklub – Ich Will Nicht Nach Berlin (2011)
- R.E.M. – Überlin (2011)
- Sido, Mario Barth – Ick liebe Dir (2011)
- Die Toten Hosen – Was Macht Berlin? (2012)
- Shezzer 1 Eye – Walking In Berlin (2012)
- Albin – Berlin (2012)
- New Politics – Berlin (2013)
- In Isolation – Berlin (2013)
- David Bowie – Where Are We Now? (2013)
- Eastintya – Be Berlin (2013)
- LCD Soundsystem – North American Scum
- Metronomy – The Bay
- Hello Saferide – Berlin (2014)
- Under Pub – Berlin (2014)
- AK Ausserkontrolle – Echte Berliner (2015)
- Romano – Köpenick (2015)
- Ufo361 – Ich bin ein Berliner (2015)
- Parquet Courts – Berlin got blurry (2016)
- Endlich August – Das ist Berlin (2016)
- Fler – Unterwegs feat. Sentino (2016)
- Max Koffler – Choose your fate (2017)
- Bushido ft. AK Ausserkontrolle – Echte Berliner (2017)
- Die Toten Hosen - Wannsee (2017)
- Deep Throat Choir - In Berlin (2017)
- Vidi Aquam – Breathless (2018)
- Shakira – Nada (2018)
- Bear's Den – Berlin (2016)
- Juju - Sommer in Berlin, Winter in Berlin (2019)
- NO MORE – Berlin Soul (2021)
- Joakim Thåström - Södra Korset (2021)
- Eli SV - Berlin (2022)
- Purple Disco Machine and Sophie and the Giants - In the dark (2022)
- Ski Aggu, Domiziana – Tour de Berlin (2022)
- Longus Mongus, BHZ – Unsere Stadt (2023)
- Ritter Lean – Berlin Boujee (Mama hat gesagt) (2023)
- Paula Carolina – Schreien! (2023)
- Calin – Berlín (2023)
- MCR-T, Miss Bashful – Sad Slut (2023)
- Mark Barrott - Berlin (2025)
