= Hermann Frenkel =

Hermann Frenkel (born May 21, 1850, Danzig - died May 26, 1932, Berlin) was a partner of the Jacquier and Securius Bank and after 1923 a partner of Friedrich Minoux, owner of the Wannsee Villa, later the venue of the Wannsee Conference. Frenkel was a Privy Commercial Councillor (Geheimer Kommerzienrat), and one of the founders of Universum Film AG. Frenkel was also a noted art collector, who concentrated on German, French, and Spanish 19th-century paintings, as well as Dutch 17th-century and Venetian 18th-century works. His heirs sold most of the collection in October 1932. Some works were not sold, among them a still-life by Snyders, which today is in the Museum Kunstpalast in Düsseldorf, which was bought in 1938.
