= Jacquier and Securius Bank =

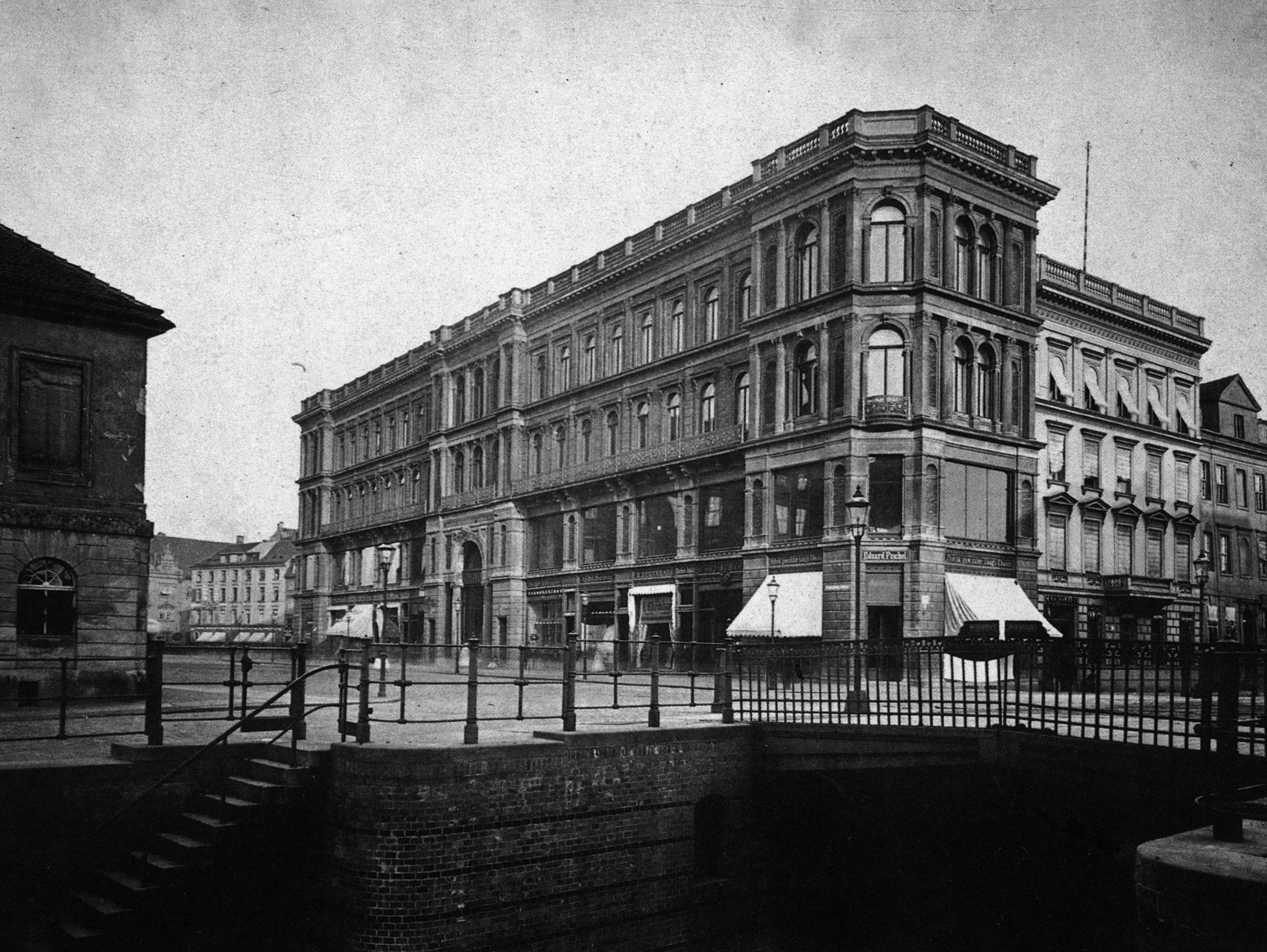
Rotes Schloss

The Jacquier and Securius Bank was a prominent German private bank founded in 1817 by August Jacquier and Henrich Securius. The bank's headquarters were located in central Berlin in a building nicknamed the Red Castle (German: Rotes Schloß). Originally under Jewish ownership, the bank began the process of Aryanization in 1933, which Richard Lenz and Robert Kraus becoming the majority stakeholders. The bank was closed by 1945 after its assets had been taken by the state its buildings sold.

== History ==
=== Founding ===
The Jacquier and Securius Bank was founded on August 11, 1817, by Friedrich Wilhelm Jacquier and John August Securius. Jacquier and Securius had previously worked together at the Huguenot banking firm L. Guillemot and F.W. Jacquier, serving as senior partner and treasurer respectively. Initially, the bank's main clients were small and medium-sized businesses whose money was invested in fixed income securities. Yet by the turn of the century, the bank had diversified by investing in industrial businesses.

=== The golden years (1878-1933) ===
==== Three "self-made" men ====
In 1872, Hermann Frenkel became senior manager of the Berlin Commercial and Exchange Bank, a subsidiary bank under the Jacquier and Securius umbrella. When this offshoot bank was liquidated on July 1, 1878, Frenkel, along with certain other members of staff, was absorbed into Jacquier and Securius. Frenkel rose quickly; at the age of 28, he became one of the bank's three partners. By 1902, he had emerged as the bank's leading figure; Jacquier's involvement had faded as he aged, and Securius had long since ceded his share of the bank's assets to a close friend, Sigismund Samuel. In November 1902, Frenkel bought out his partners with a capital investment equalling some 900,000 German gold marks. Within the next year, Frenkel took on two junior partners - Albert Pinkuss and Eugene Panofsky. Pinkuss, Frenkel's brother-in-law, was a pioneer of German soft-coal mining with an estimated fortune of 8,100,000 marks. Panofsky, on the other hand, started as a cashier at Jacquier and Securius in 1875. He was, however, politically active, and sat on the boards of a number of municipal committees. Impressed with his political clout, "Frenkel realised... his value as a potential partner and quickly promoted him."

==== Keeping it in the family ====
Arthur Frenkel, the eldest son of Hermann Frenkel, became a partner in 1918. A year later, together with his father and Eugene Panofsky, his brother Erich and family friend Max Landesmann were admitted as partners. In 1924, Alfred Panofsky assumed his father's position in the bank. After six years of middling success, in December 1925, Arthur Frenkel ceded his profit share to his younger and more talented brother, Erich.

==== The involvement of Friedrich Minoux ====
In 1923 Friedrich Minoux, one of the most enigmatic figures of the Weimar period, invested one million German gold marks to become a partner of Jacquier and Securius in order to secure liquidity for his various business interests. "This sum comprised a quarter of the bank's capital." During his time as partner of the bank, Minoux took part in a 150 million German gold mark project to build canals in Constantinople. In addition, a consortium of other banks led by Minoux, Jacquier and Securius secured a "majority of stock in cigarette maker August Batscharis. On January 31st 1931, Minoux sold his stake in Jacquier and Securius, yet he retained his offices within the bank's headquarters.

=== Events following Machtergreifung (1933-1938) ===
==== Gleichschaltung ====
Adolf Hitler's rise to power in 1933 precipitated serious political, economic and social changes within Germany. The ensuing process of Gleichschaltung (English: Bringing into line) entailed systematic social and economic discrimination against Germany's Jewish population. However, the need to maintain a sound banking system meant that the partners of Jacquier and Securius were not subject to serious discrimination until the mid-1930s. That said, even the 'reasonable' conditions required by Gleichschaltung were enough to convince Erich Frenkel that he "had no future in Germany."

===== 'Aryan' partners =====
In the summer of 1933, Jacquier and Securius was coerced into taking on a new partner by the incumbent government. Gerhard Ueltzen became the bank's newest partner, though, according to all accounts, he "turned out to be not very reliable." Max Landesmann, who had had an interest in the banking house since 1919, was told to leave the company; Alfred Panofsky, the son of former partner Eugene Panofsky, was blocked from management for some months. Furthermore, the Reichsbank demanded that another 'Aryan' partner be integrated into the bank. However, this time the Jewish bankers were allowed to select this new partner themselves. The man chosen was Robert Kraus.

=== The process of Aryanisation (1938) ===
Since the beginning of 1937, the remaining bankers had been trying to sell Jacquier and Securius, but had been unable to do so. Alfred Panofsky's intention had been to liquidate the banking house and emigrate. Finally, a deal was reached with Robert Kraus, one of the current partners, and Richard Lenz. Lenz had prospered hugely in the five years following Hitler's takeover of power. He was a member of the Nazi Party and had used his connections with Friedrich Reinhart, the President of the Berlin Chamber of Commerce and Industry and avid supporter of authoritarian government, to develop Richard Lenz and Co. into a prosperous business.

==== Alfred Panofsky and Co. in Liquidation ====
On March 1, 1938, Richard Lenz and Robert Kraus took over accounts receivable and payable for 3,600,000 Reichsmark (RM) and the name of the formerly Jewish banking house. The bank itself, for all intents and purposes fully Aryanised, changed its name to Alfred Panofsky and Co. in Liquidation.

===== Operations under Richard Lenz and Robert Kraus =====
The new Jacquier and Securius desperately needed start-up capital to stay afloat in the short term. This was provided in part by Deutsche Bank which contributed one million RM in a silent investment. Another half a million RM came from the pockets of Richard Lenz, himself. Negotiations on behalf of Deutsche Bank were conducted by Hermann Josef Abs and Eduard Mosler. The state participated through the Reich's Commissioner for lending, Friedrich Ernst. Richard Lenz wasted little time in taking advantage of the situation. Over the next year he bought out five other small Jewish banks under the name of Jacquier and Securius. Unfortunately for Lenz and Kraus, the vast majority of the acquired clients were also Jewish. As Nazi Germany's anti-Semitism continued and grew, even the bank's most wealthy clients faced impoverishment. By 1938, a third of the original equity in Jacquier and Securius had been lost. In 1945, the business was shut down, and Deutsche Bank was repaid through release of equity capital.

===== Harbouring Jews? =====
From 1938 onwards, at least five Jewish employees worked for Jacquier and Securius under its 'aryan' ownership. One of them was 'in disguise' until 1943 - well into World War II. This harbouring of Jewish people on Lenz and Kraus' behalf brought with it the significant danger of being pilloried as a sympathizer.

=== Compensation claims ===
Almost immediately after the Second World War ended, legal proceeding between Lenz's heirs and the heirs of the Jewish bankers began. Eventually, in 1964, a settlement was reached where Lenz's heirs paid 35,000 DM in compensation to the various families. After the reunification of East and West Germany, the heirs of Lenz and Kraus fought over a 100,000 DM payment that Kraus made back to the bank in 1941. Far more substantial claims than these are those relating to the private property of the three Jewish banking families. Of particular interest is compensation for the physical estate of Hermann Frenkel, and a pair of paintings (one a Murillo, and one an Adriaen van de Velde) that were said to be stored in the bank's headquarters at Rotes Schloss.

== See also ==
- Friedrich Minoux
- Hermann Frenkel
- World Jewish Congress lawsuit against Swiss banks
- List of banks in Germany

== Bibliography ==
- Kahmann, Henning (2001). Die Bankiers Von Jacquier & Securius 1933 - 1945: Eine Rechtshistorische Fallstudie Zur "Arisierung" Eines Berliner Bankhauses. Frankfurt Am Main: Peter Lang. ISBN 3-631-38987-6.
- Lehrer, Steven (2000). Wannsee House and the Holocaust. Jefferson, North Carolina: McFarland & Company. ISBN 978-0-7864-0792-7.
- Harold, James (2000). The Deutsche Bank and the Nazi economic war against the Jews. Cambridge, England: Cambridge University Press. ISBN 0-521-80329-2.
- Fraser, Monika (2001). Der Privatbankier: Nischenstrategien in Geschichte Und Gegenwart. Stuttgart: Steiner. ISBN 3-515-08311-1.
- Kreutzmüller, Christoph (2007). Eugen Panofsky: (1855 - 1922); Berliner Bankier, Stadtrat Und Stadtältester. Teetz: Hentrich & Hentrich. ISBN 978-3-938485-60-6.
- Lehrer, Steven (2002). Hitler Sites: A City-by-city Guidebook (Austria, Germany, France, United States). McFarland. p. 224. ISBN 0-7864-1045-0.
- Schulz, Gerhard (1992). Zwischen Demokratie Und Diktatur: Verfassungspolitik Und Reichsreform in Der Weimarer Republik. Berlin: W. De Gruyter. ISBN 3-11-013525-6.
