= Music in Berlin =

Berlin as an influential musical center in Europe

Since the 18th century Berlin has been an influential musical center in Germany and Europe. First as an important trading city in the Hanseatic League, then as the capital of the electorate of Brandenburg and the Prussian Kingdom, later on as one of the biggest cities in Germany it fostered an influential music culture that remains vital until today. Berlin can be regarded as the breeding ground for the powerful choir movement that played such an important role in the broad socialization of music in Germany during the 19th century.

== History ==
=== 18th century ===
When in 1701 Frederick III declared himself Frederick I, "King in Prussia", Berlin became a royal residence and subsequently attained more musical prestige. Under his successor Frederick William I (1713–1740), musical life in Berlin lost part of its splendor, due to his focus on the military strengthening of Prussia. At that time the court orchestra was abandoned and music events at the court played only a decorative role.

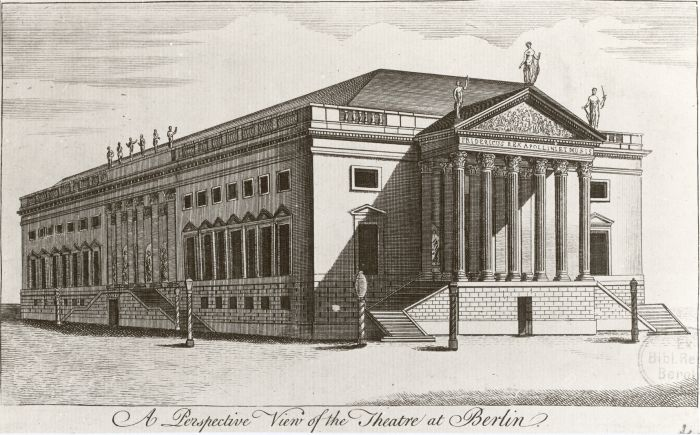
The opera in Berlin around 1745

When in 1740, Frederick II came to power, musical life at the court flourished again. Many 18th-century writers have termed his reign the "Golden Age" for music making in Berlin. Although statements like this have to be regarded with care for their obvious intention to glorify the person of the ruler, Frederick's reign was indeed a fruitful time for music making in Berlin. Already at Rheinsberg, where Frederick lived when he was still the crown prince, he had assembled a formidable group of musicians who were to form the core of his Kapelle in Berlin. Among these followers were Carl Heinrich and Johann Gottlieb Graun, Franz and Johann Benda, Christoph Schaffrath, and Johann Gottlieb Janitsch. Once installed as the King in Prussia, Frederick's Kapelle became quickly one of the most admired orchestras in Europe. Frederick who was an accomplished flautist and composer employed Europe's foremost flautist, Johann Joachim Quantz in 1741. His Kappelle, headed by C. H. Graun, could also boast of C. P. E. Bach, son of Johann Sebastian Bach, who joined the orchestra as harpsichordist in 1740, and of Johann Friedrich Agricola as the official court composer. By 1750 around 50 musicians were in Frederick's employment.

Frédéric Chopin playing the piano in Prince Radziwill's Berlin Salon in the Palais Radziwill (Henryk Siemiradzki, 1887)

The principal occasions at which music was played at the court included the daily soirées in which Frederick used to play the flute, and the concerts in the residence of the King's mother, Sophia Dorothea of Hanover at which Frederick's Kapelle had to perform as well. In addition to these regular events, the Kapelle also had to perform in the opera performances during Lent. Other important venues for music making at the Hohenzollern court were the residences of Prince Henry of Prussia and Margrave Frederick Henry.

Frederick, an ardent opera enthusiast, was determined to turn Berlin into an international center for opera, one that could compete with the splendid opera house in Dresden. To this end, Frederick commissioned two opera stages from his architect George Wenzeslaus von Knobelsdorff. The first in the King's residence, the Berliner Stadtschloß, the second as a completely new opera house, located Unter den Linden, the main artery of Berlin which featured all of the representational buildings of the time. The stage in the Stadtschloß was inaugurated with a performance of Graun's Rodelinda on December 13, 1741. The construction of the new opera house started in 1741 and although not fully completed yet the first performance took place on December 7, 1742 with Graun's Cleopatra e Cesare. In preparation of the two premieres, Frederick sent Graun to Italy and France in order to recruit singers and dancers respectively. The Königliche Opernhaus, as the new opera house was called, remained the main opera house of Berlin throughout the century and the repertoire given there consisted mainly of Italian opera seria.

=== 20th century ===
From the end of World War II Berlin was divided. A western sector, controlled by Britain, France, the United States, controlled eventually, in 1949, was within territory under the control of a new West German state, the Federal Republic of Germany. The eastern section, under the control of Soviet Union's occupying force, went under the control of a new east German state, the German Democratic Republic. The city's long-standing concert music institutions were in the two sections. In the West was the Berlin Philharmonic Orchestra; in the East was the Konzerthausorchester Berlin or Berlin Symphony Orchestra, the Berlin Radio Symphony Orchestra (East Berlin), as well as the Staatskapelle Berlin, the orchestra associated with the Berlin State Opera, which resided in the eastern sector of Berlin.

The SO36 in Kreuzberg originally focused largely on punk music, but today has become a popular venue for many dances and parties. SOUND, located from 1971 to 1988 in Tiergarten and today in Charlottenburg, gained notoriety in the late 1970s for its popularity with heroin users and other drug addicts as described in the book Zoo Station: The Story of Christiane F.

With a "New Europe" emerging at the end of the Cold War, the rock band U2 chose Berlin, in the centre of the reuniting continent, as a source of inspiration for a more European musical aesthetic. They recorded at Hansa Studios in West Berlin, near the recently opened Berlin Wall. Several acclaimed records were made at Hansa, including two from David Bowie's "Berlin Trilogy" with Eno, and Iggy Pop's The Idiot. U2 arrived on 3 October 1990 on the last flight into East Berlin on the eve of German reunification.

Many new music and performance venues emerged in Berlin in the aftermath of the fall of the Berlin wall. Among these venues, locations such as ausland and KuLe are now renowned for presenting experimental and improvised music. The city of Berlin has developed into an international hub for experimental music and art, and this forms a core element of the programming of festivals such as transmediale and CTM Festival.

== Music industries ==
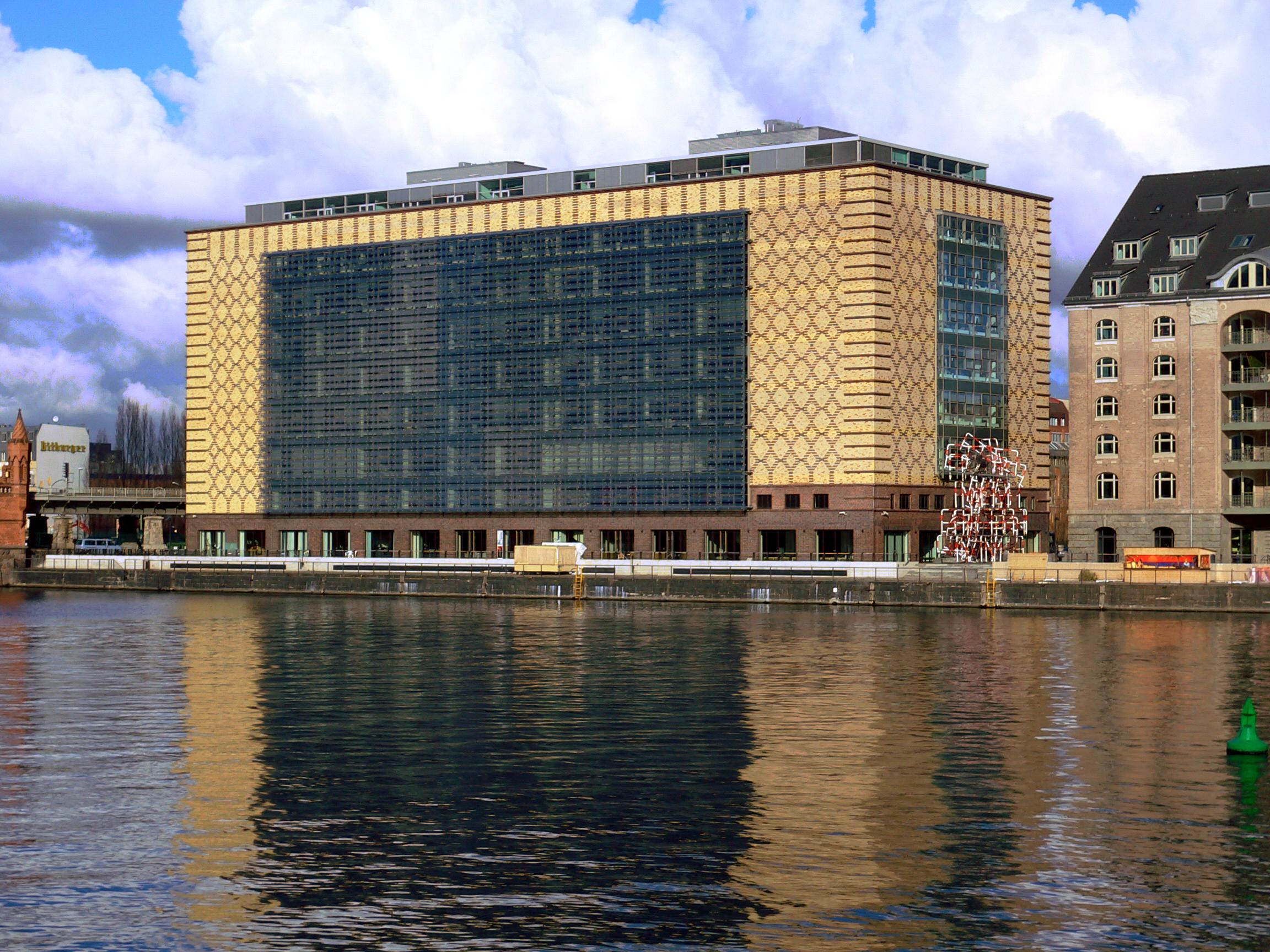
Universal Music Germany

Industries that do business in the creative arts and entertainment are an important and sizable sector of the economy of Berlin. The creative arts sector comprises music, film, advertising, architecture, art, design, fashion, performing arts, publishing, TV, radio, and video games. Around 22,600 creative enterprises, predominantly SMEs, generated over 18,6 billion Euro in total revenue. Berlin's creative industries have contributed an estimated 20% of Berlin's gross domestic product in 2005.

Berlin is home to many international and regional television and radio stations. The public broadcaster RBB has its headquarters in Berlin as well as the commercial broadcasters MTV Europe, VIVA, and N24. German international public broadcaster Deutsche Welle has its TV production unit in Berlin, and most national German broadcasters have a studio in the city. American radio programming from National Public Radio is also broadcast on the FM dial.

== Personalities ==
Many important musical figures have worked in Berlin, among them composers like Johann Joachim Quantz, Carl Philipp Emanuel Bach, the Graun brothers, Wilhelm Friedemann Bach, Carl Friedrich Christian Fasch, Johann Friedrich Reichardt, Carl Friedrich Zelter, Friedrich Heinrich Himmel, Vincenzo Righini, Felix Mendelssohn Bartholdy, Spontini, Meyerbeer, Richard Strauss, Arnold Schoenberg to name just a few. Moreover, Berlin was recognized as the center for music theory and criticism in the 18th century with leading figures like Friedrich Wilhelm Marpurg, Johann Philipp Kirnberger, Quantz, and C. P. E. Bach whose treatises were being read all over Europe. Later on, writers like Reichardt, E. T. A. Hoffmann, Ludwig Rellstab, and A. B. Marx contributed to what can arguably be called the origins of German Music Feuilleton, whilst Adolf Martin Schlesinger founded one of the leading German music publishing houses.

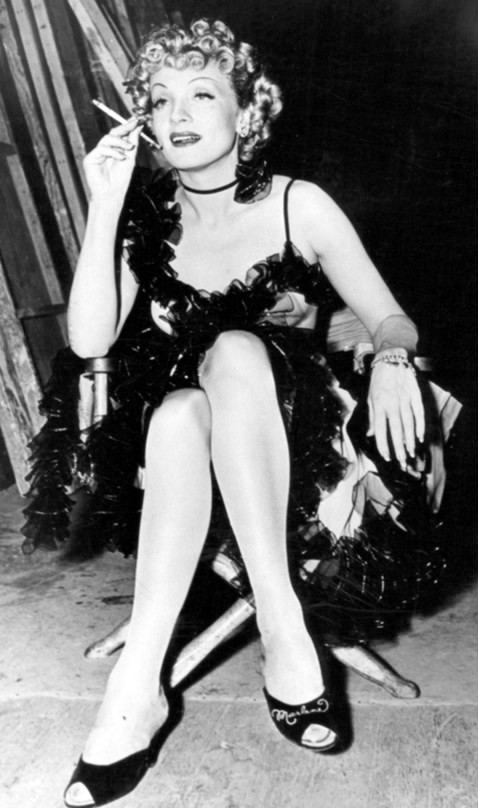
Marlene Dietrich

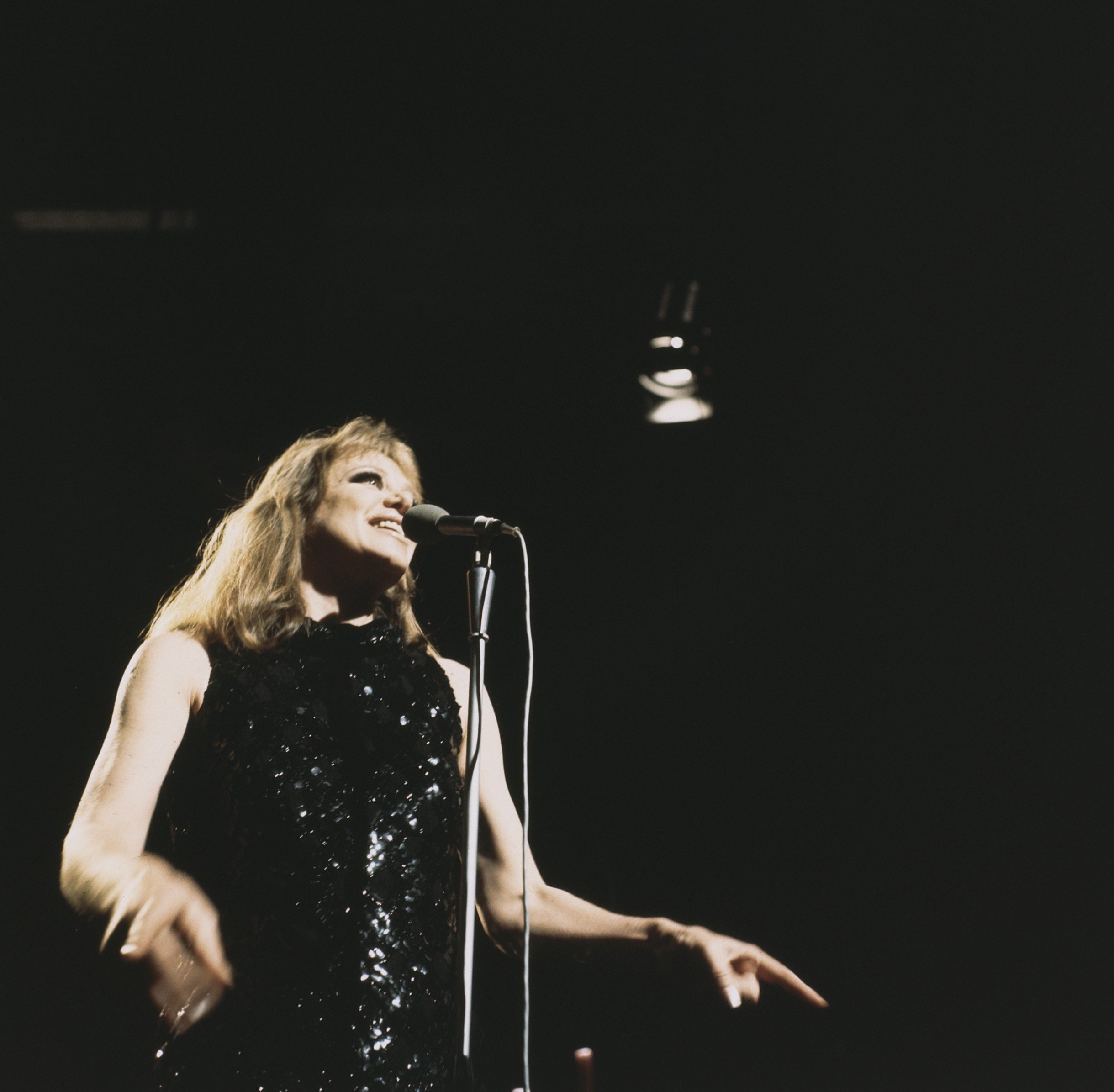
Hildegard Knef

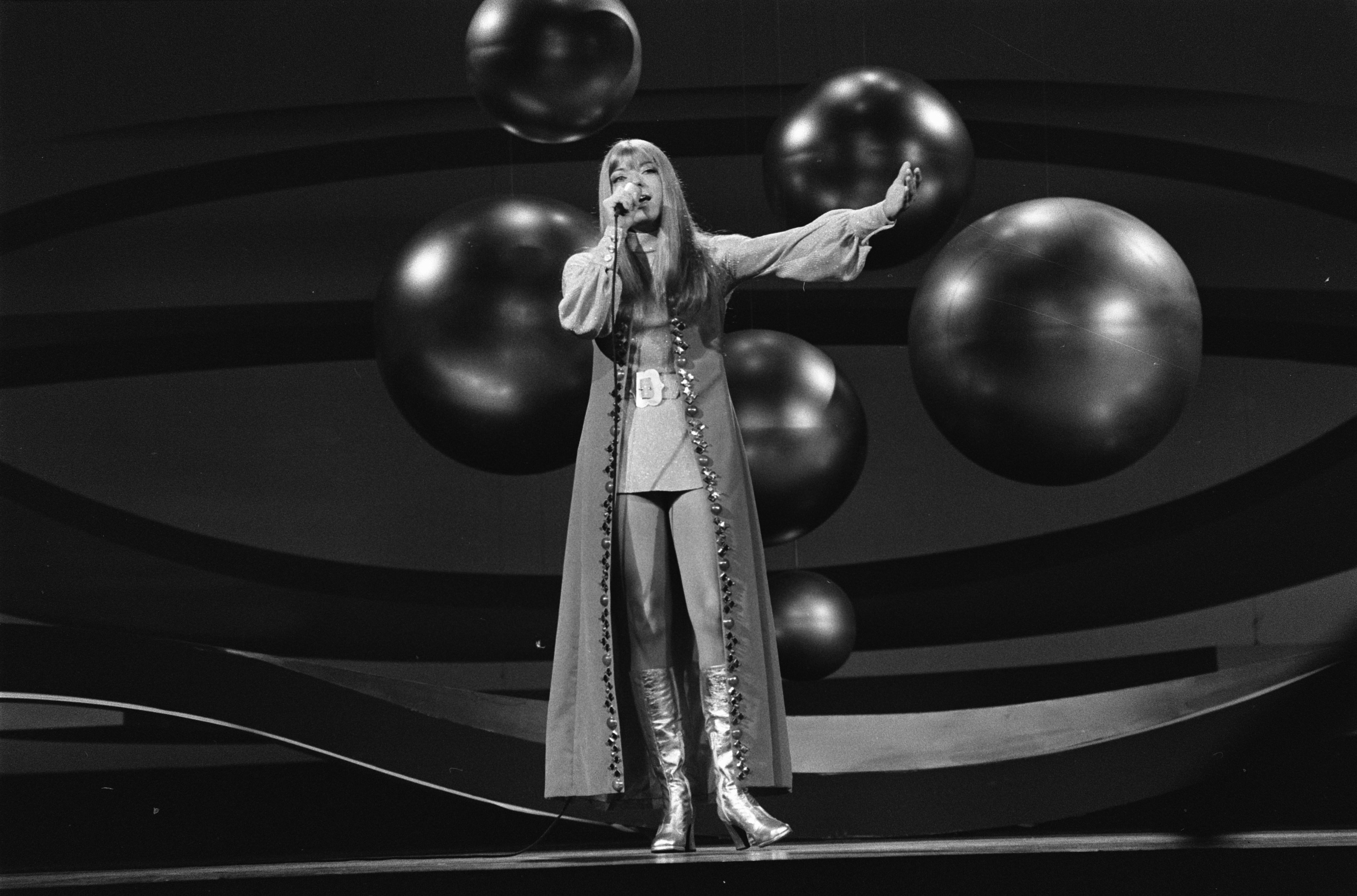
Katja Ebstein

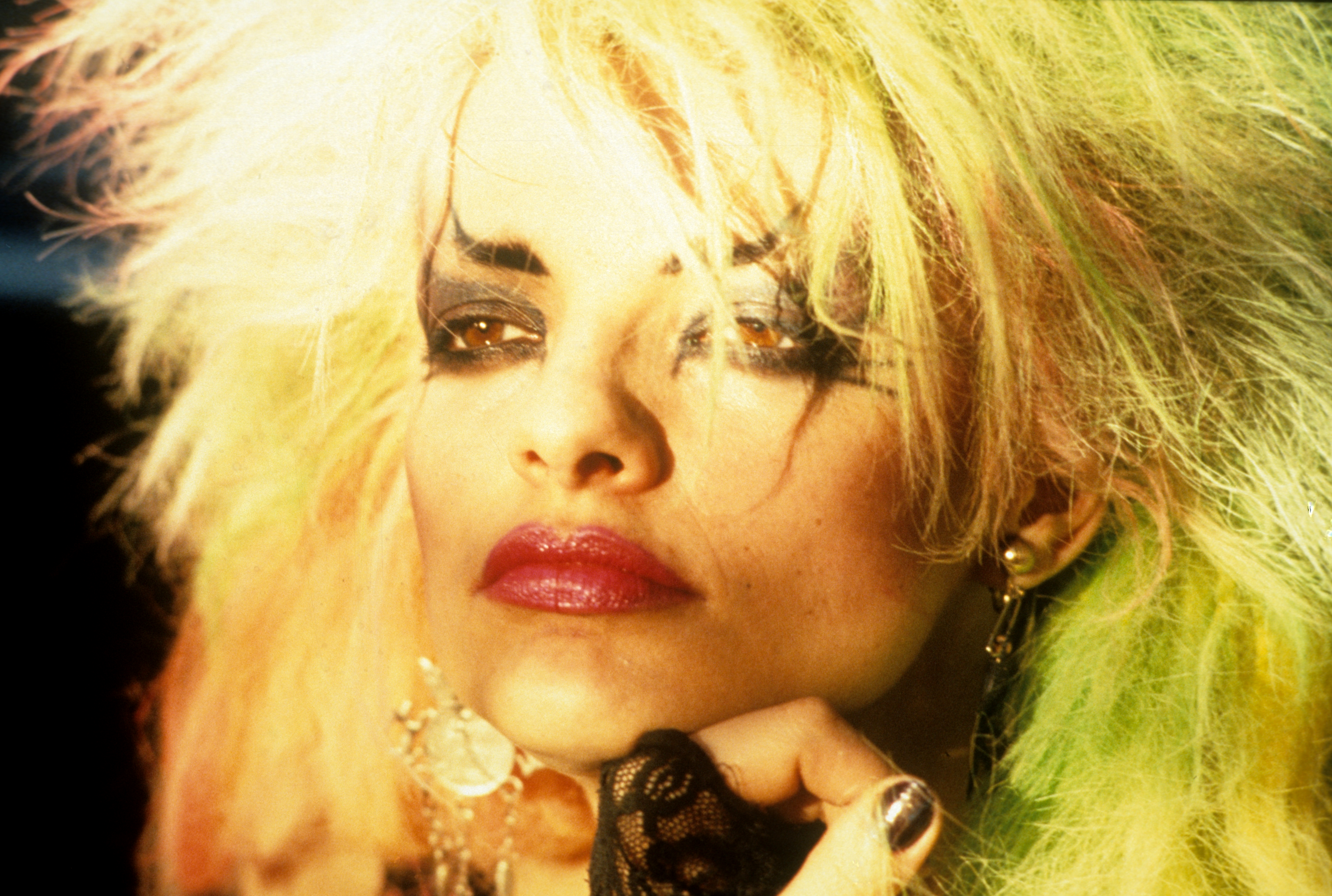
Nina Hagen

== Opera houses ==
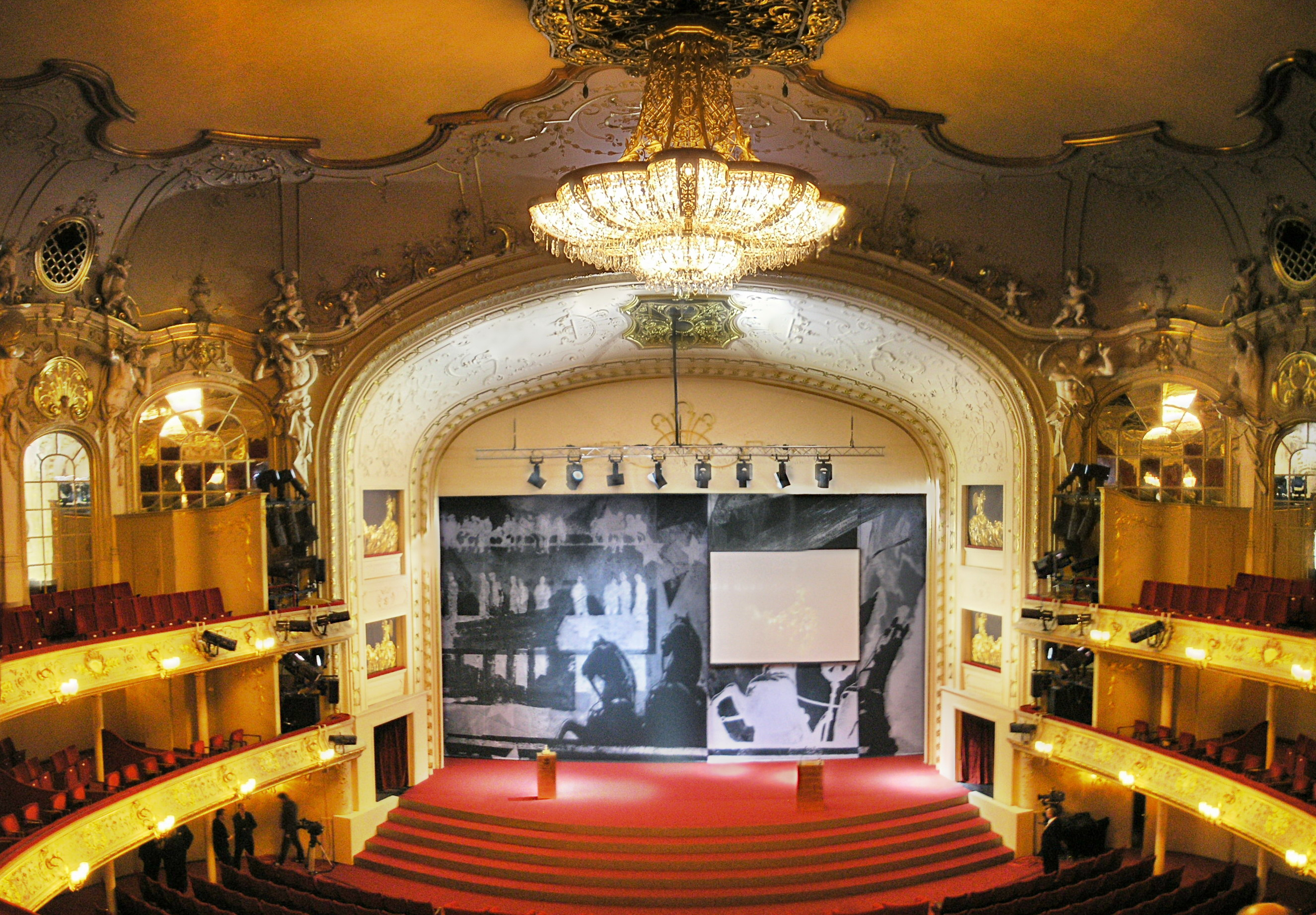
Stage of Komische Oper Berlin

Berlin has three major opera houses: the Deutsche Oper, the Berlin State Opera, and the Komische Oper. The Berlin State Opera on Unter den Linden is the oldest; it opened in 1742. Its current musical director is Daniel Barenboim. During the Cold War division it was in East Berlin. The Komische Oper, which has traditionally specialized in operettas, is located not far from the State Opera just off Unter den Linden; it was also in East Berlin. It originally opened in 1892 as a theater and has been operating under its current name since 1947. The Deutsche Oper opened in 1912 in Charlottenburg. During the division of the city from 1961 to 1989 it was the only major opera house in West Berlin.

== Musical theatres ==
The Theater des Westens is Berlin's major venue for performances of musical theatre.

== Orchestras ==
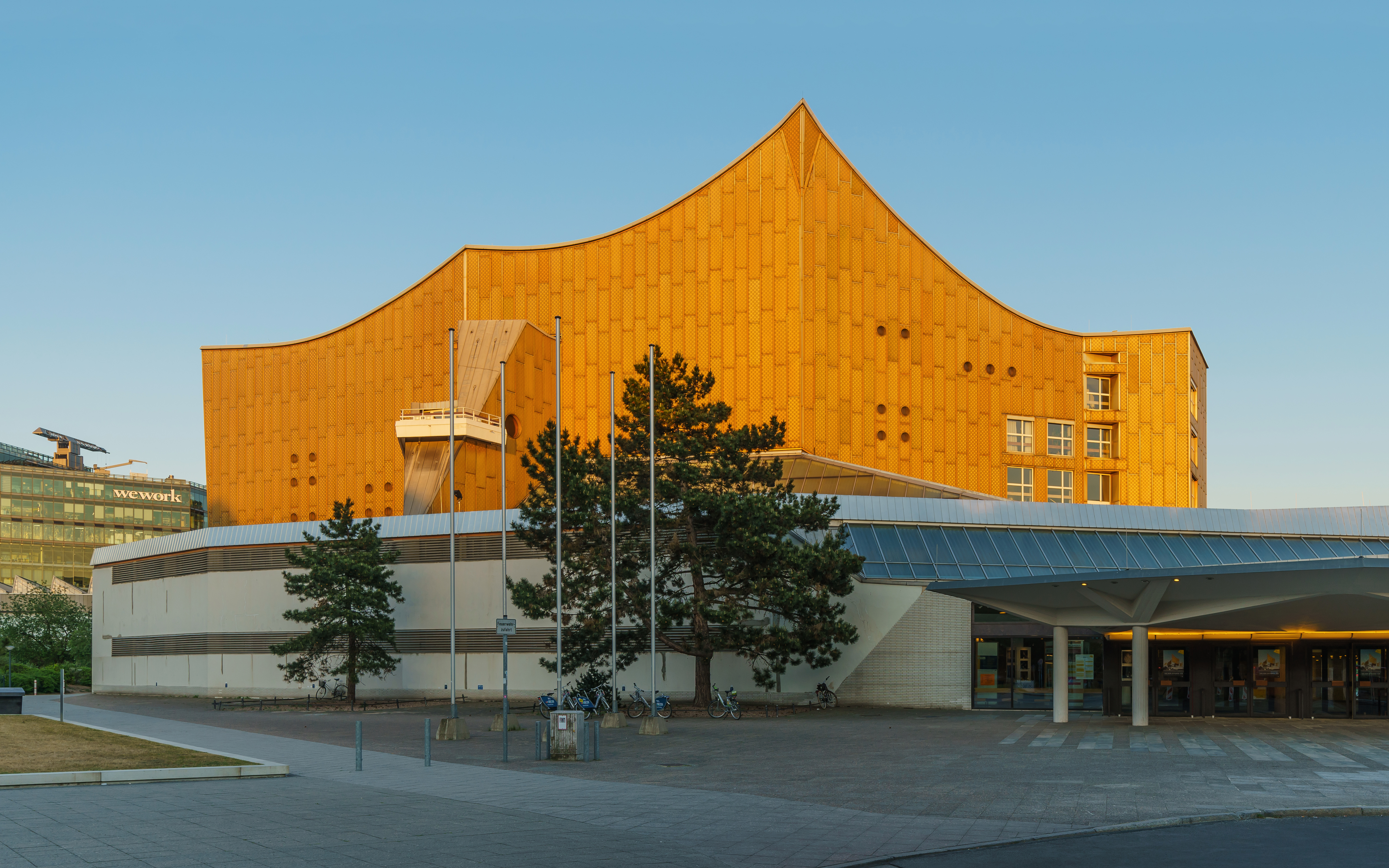
Berliner Philharmonie

There are several symphony orchestras in Berlin:

- The Berlin Philharmonic Orchestra is one of the preeminent orchestras in the world. It is housed in the Philharmonie near Potsdamer Platz on a street named after the orchestra's longest-serving conductor, Herbert von Karajan. The principal conductor from 2002 to 2018 was Simon Rattle; starting 2019 the new conductor will be Kirill Petrenko.
- The Konzerthausorchester Berlin, founded in 1952 as the orchestra for East Berlin (since the Philharmonic was based in West Berlin) and called the "Berliner Sinfonie-Orchester" until 2006, when it adopted the name of its home hall, the Konzerthaus on Gendarmenmarkt. Its current principal conductor is Iván Fischer.
- The Rundfunk-Sinfonieorchester Berlin, founded in 1923 and the oldest active radio orchestra in Germany. It enjoyed in its early years a reputation for contemporary music: Hindemith, Honegger, Milhaud, Prokofiev, Strauss, Schoenberg and Stravinsky all guest-conducted. After the 1949 division of Germany it was supervised by the Rundfunk der DDR. Since 2002, the chief conductor has been Marek Janowski.
- The Deutsches Symphonie-Orchester Berlin, founded in 1946 by American occupation forces as the "RIAS-Symphonie-Orchester" (RIAS being the acronym for "Rundfunk im amerikanischen Sektor"/"Radio In the American Sector"). It was renamed the "Radio-Symphonie-Orchester Berlin" in 1956 and took on its present name in 1993. The orchestra's first principal conductor was Ferenc Fricsay; Vladimir Ashkenazy, Riccardo Chailly and Kent Nagano have since served.
- The Staatskapelle Berlin, i.e., the pit orchestra of the Staatsoper Unter den Linden (see above), whose music director is Daniel Barenboim.
- The Berliner Symphoniker (not to be confused with the former Berliner Sinfonie-Orchester), whose chief conductor since 1997 has been Lior Shambadal.

== Choirs ==
The city's many choral ensembles include the professional Rundfunkchor Berlin, the Sing-Akademie zu Berlin, the Berliner Singakademie, the Philharmonischer Chor Berlin, and the RIAS Kammerchor.

== Festivals ==
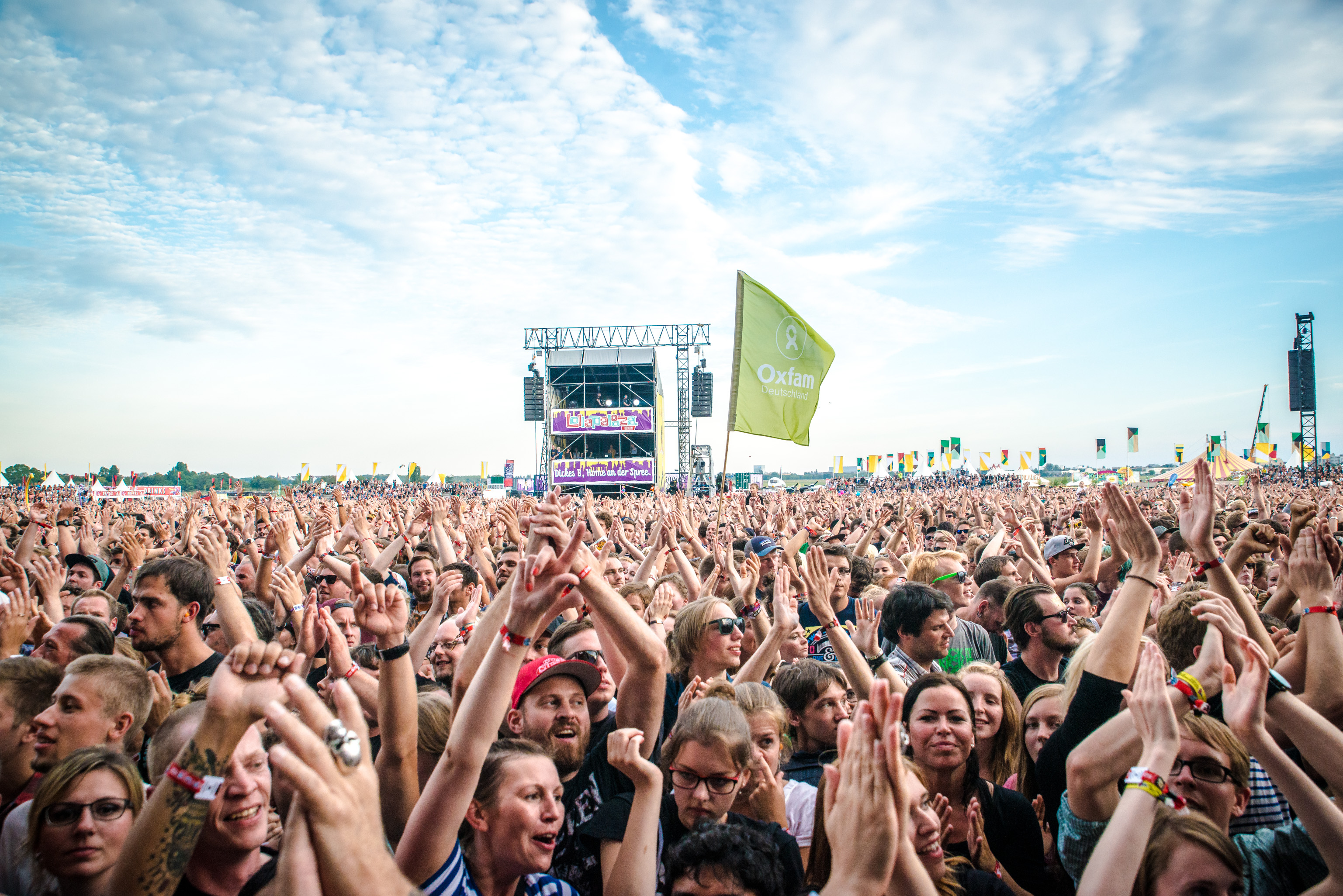
Lollapalooza, Berlin

- Berlin Festival
- Fete de la Musique
- JazzFest Berlin
- Lollapalooza Berlin

== Clubs and nightlife ==
Berlin's nightlife is one of the most diverse and vibrant of its kind in Europe. The music club, Linientreu, near the Kaiser Wilhelm Memorial Church, has been in business in the late 1980s and 1990s. Throughout the 1990s, people in their twenties from many countries, made Berlin's club scene the premier nightlife destination in the world. After the fall of the Berlin Wall in 1989, many historic buildings in Mitte, the former city center of East Berlin, were illegally occupied and re-built by young squatters and became a fertile ground for underground and counterculture gatherings.

Mitte and surrounding boroughs were home to many nightclubs, including Kunst Haus Tacheles, Cookies, Tresor, WMF, Ufo, E-Werk, KitKatClub and Berghain. Berlin is notable for the length of its parties. Clubs are not required to close at a fixed time on the weekends, and many parties last well into the morning, or all weekend. Berghain features the Panorama Bar, so named because the bar opens its shades at daybreak, allowing party-goer's a panorama view of Berlin after dancing through the night.

== See also ==
- Culture of Berlin
- Weimar Culture
- List of songs about Berlin

== Bibliography ==
- Allihn, Ingeborg. "Der Einfluß Der Französischen Aufklärung Auf Die Preußische Königliche Hofkapelle Und Den Beginn Des Bürgerlichen Musiklebens in Berlin Um 1750." In Aufklärungen. Studien Zur Deutsch-Französischen Musikgeschichte Im 18. Jahrhundert. Einflüsse Und Wirkungen., edited by Wolfgang; Mahling Birtel, Christoph-Hellmut [eds], 172-79. Heidelberg: Carl Winter, Universitätsverlag, 1986.
- Arnheim, Amalie. "Zur Geschichte Der Liebhaberkonzerte in Berlin Im 18. Jahrhundert." Mitteilungen des Vereins für die Geschichte Berlins 30 (1913): 166.
- Bauman, Thomas. North German Opera in the Age of Goethe. Cambridge; New York: Cambridge University Press, 1985.
- Blumner, Martin. Geschichte Der Sing-Akademie Zu Berlin. 256 p.; 24 cm. vols. Berlin: Horn & Raasch, 1891.
- Bollert, Werner, and Berliner Singakademie. Sing-Akademie Zu Berlin. Festschrift Zum 175 Jährigen Bestehen. Berlin: Rembrandt Verlag, 1966.
- Born, Gerhard. Die Gründung Des Berliner National-Theaters Und Die Geschichte Seines Personals, Seines Spielplans Und Seiner Verwaltung Bis Zu Doebbelins Abgang (1786–1789). Borna-Leipzig: R. Noske, 1934.
- Bornemann, Wilhelm. Die Zelter'sche Liedertafel, 1851.
- Brachvogel, Albert Emil. Geschichte Des Königlichen Theaters Zu Berlin. Nach Archivalien Des Königl. Geh. Staats-Archivs Und Des Königl. Theaters. Berlin: O. Janke, 1877.
- Busch, Gudrun. "Zwischen Berliner Musikliebhabern Und Berliner Anglophilie, Aufklärung Und Empfindsamkeit: Zur Genese Der Frühesten Berliner Händel-Rezeption 1748–1771." In Händel-Rezeption Der Frühen Goethe-Zeit. Kolloquium Goethe-Museum Düsseldorf 1997, edited by Laurenz Lütteken, 81-134. Kassel, 2000.
- Dahlhaus, Carl. Studien Zur Musikgeschichte Berlins Im Frühen 19. Jahrhundert, Studien Zur Musikgeschichte Des 19. Jahrhunderts; Bd. 56. Regensburg: Bosse, 1980.
- Debuch, Tobias. Ferdinand Von Preußen (1772–1806) Als Musiker Im Soziokulturellen Umfeld Seiner Zeit. Berlin: Logos, 2004.
- Eberle, Gottfried, and Michael Rautenberg. Die Sing-Akademie Zu Berlin Und Ihre Direktoren. Berlin: Staatliches Institut für Musikforschung Preußischer Kulturbesitz, 1998.
- Elvers, Rudolf. "Musikdrucker, Musikalienhändler Und Musikverleger in Berlin 1750 Bis 1850. Eine Übersicht." In Festschrift Walter Gerstenberg Zum 60. Geburtstag, edited by Georg von; Holschneider Dadelsen, Andreas, 37-44. Wolfenbüttel, 1964.
- Fischer-Dieskau, Dietrich. Carl Friedrich Zelter Und Das Berliner Musikleben Seiner Zeit: Eine Biographie. Berlin: Nicolai, 1997.
- Flueler, M. Die Norddeutsche Sinfonie Zur Zeit Friedrichs D. Gr. Berlin, 1908.
- Gädicke, Johann Christian. Lexicon Von Berlin. Berlin, 1806.
- Gelber, L. Die Liederkomponisten August Harder, Friedrich Heinrich Himmel, Friedrich Franz Hurka, Carl Gottlieb Hering: Ein Beitrag Zur Geschichte Des Musikalischen Liedes Zu Anfang Des 19. Jahrhunderts. Berlin, 1936.
- Gerhard, Anselm. Musik Und Ästhetik Im Berlin Moses Mendelssohns, Wolfenbütteler Studien Zur Aufklärung, Bd. 25. Tübingen: M. Niemeyer, 1999.
- Graf, Herbert. Das Repertoire Des Öffentlichen Opern- Und Singspielbühnen in Berlin Seit Dem Jahre 1771. vols. Vol. 1. Berlin, 1934.
- Guttmann, Oskar. Johann Karl Friedrich Rellstab. Ein Beitrag Zur Musikgeschichte Berlins. Berlin: E. Ebering, 1910.
- Heartz, Daniel. Music in European Capitals: The Galant Style, 1720–1780. 1st ed. New York: W.W. Norton, 2003.
- Hell, Helmut. "'Geschwister' Finden Zueinander. Das Musikarchiv Der Sing-Akademie Zu Berlin Als Depositum in Der Musikabteilung Der Staatsbibliothek Zu Berlin." Jahrbuch des Staatlichen Instituts für Musikforschung – Preußischer Kulturbesitz (2002): 18-24.
- Helm, E. Eugene. Music at the Court of Frederick the Great. [1st] ed. Norman: University of Oklahoma Press, 1960.
- Henzel, Christoph. "Agricola Und Andere. Berliner Komponisten Im Notenarchiv Der Sing-Akademie Zu Berlin." Jahrbuch des Staatlichen Instituts für Musikforschung – Preußischer Kulturbesitz (2003): 31- 98.
- ———. "Die Musikalien Der Sing-Akademie Zu Berlin Und Die Berliner Graun-Überlieferung." Jahrbuch des Staatlichen Instituts für Musikforschung – Preußischer Kulturbesitz (2002): 60-106.
- ———. ""Die Zeit Des Augustus in Der Musik". Berliner Klassik. Ein Versuch." In Jahrbuch Des Staatlichen Instituts Für Musikforschung Preußischer Kulturbesitz, 126-50. Berlin, 2003.
- ———. Quellentexte Zur Berliner Musikgeschichte Im 18. Jahrhundert. 1. Aufl. ed, Taschenbücher Zur Musikwissenschaft; 135. Wilhelmshaven: F. Noetzel, 1999.
- ———. "Studien Zur Graun-Überlieferung Im 18. Jahrhundert." Habil, Universität Rostock, 2001.
- ———. "Von Wien Nach Berlin. Neue Dokumente Zu Den Beziehungen Haydns Und Dittersdorfs Zum Preußischen Hof 1786/87." Jahrbuch des Staatlichen Instituts für Musikforschung – Preußischer Kulturbesitz (1998): 106-14.
- ———. "Zwischen Hofoper Und Nationaltheater. Aspekte Der Gluckrezeption in Berlin Um 1800." Archiv für Musikwissenschaft 50, no. 3 (1993): 201-16.
- Höcker, Karla. Hauskonzerte in Berlin. Berlin, 1970.
- Internationale Fasch-Gesellschaft e.V. Zerbst. Carl Friedrich Christian Fasch (1736–1800) Und Das Berliner Musikleben Seiner Zeit: Bericht Über Die Internationale Wissenschaftliche Konferenz Am 16. Und 17. April 1999 Im Rahmen Der 6. Internationalen Fasch-Festtage in Zerbst, Fasch-Studien; Vol. 7. Dessau: Anhaltische Verlagsgesellschaft, 1999.
- Kalischer, Alfred Christian. Beethoven Und Berlin, 1908.
- Kretzschmar, Hermann. Festschrift Zur Feier Des Hundertjährigen Bestehens Des Staatlichen Akademischen Instituts Für Kirchenmusik in Berlin: 1822–1922. Berlin, 1922.
- Kuhlo, Hermann, and Berliner Singakademie. Geschichte Der Zelterschen Liedertafel Von 1809 Bis 1909. Berlin: Horn & Raasch, 1909.
- Ledebur, Carl. Tonkünstler-Lexicon Berlin's Von Den Ältesten Zeiten Bis Auf Die Gegenwart. Berlin: L. Rauh, 1861.
- Levezow, Konrad. Leben Und Kunst Der Frau Margarete Luise Schick, Gebornen Hamel, Königl. Preuss. Kammersängerin Und Mitgliedes Des Nationaltheaters Zu Berlin. Berlin: Duncker und Humblot, 1809.
- Lichtenstein, Hinrich. Zur Geschichte Der Sing-Akademie in Berlin. Nebst Einer Nachricht ÜBer Das Fest Am Fünfzigsten Jahrestage Ihrer Stiftung Und Einem Alphabetischen Verzeichniss Aller Personen, Die Ihr Als Mitglieder AngehöRt Haben. Berlin: Trautwein, 1843.
- Loewenthal, Siegbert. "Die Musikübende Gesellschaft Zu Berlin Und Die Mitglieder Johann Philipp Sack, Friedrich Wilhelm Riedt Und Johann Gabriel Seyffarth." Inauguraldissertation, Universität Basel, 1928.
- Mahling, Christoph-Hellmut. "Zum 'Musikbetrieb' Berlins Und Seinen Institutionen in Der Ersten Hälfte Des 19. Jahrhunderts." In Studien Zur Musikgeschichte Berlins Im Frühen 19. Jahrhundert, Bd. 59, edited by Carl Dahlhaus, 27-284. Regensburg, 1980.
- Morgenroth, Alfred. "Carl Friedrich Zelter. Eine Musikgeschichtliche Studie. I. Teil (Biographisches)." Phil. Diss., Friedrich Wilhelms Universität, 1922.
- Odendahl, Laurenz. Friedrich Heinrich Himmel, Bemerkungen Zur Geschichte Der Berliner Oper Um Die Wende Des 18. Und 19.Jahrhunderts. Bonn: P. Rost & co., 1917.
- Ottenberg, Hans-Günter. Der Critische Musicus an Der Spree: Berliner Musikschrifttum Von 1748 Bis 1799: Eine Dokumentation. 1. Aufl. ed, Kunstwissenschaften. Leipzig: Reclam, 1984.
- Plümicke, C. M. Entwurf Einer Theatergeschichte Von Berlin. Berlin/Stettin, 1781. Reprint, Leipzig 1975.
- Reichardt, Johann Friedrich. Briefe Eines Aufmerksamen Reisenden Die Musik Betreffend. Frankfurt, Leipzig, 1774.
- ———. Schreiben Über Die Berlinische Musik an Den Herrn L. V. Sch. In M. Hamburg, 1775.
- Reichardt, Johann Friedrich, and Friedrich Ludwig Aemilius Kunzen. Musikalische Monathsschrift. Berlin, 1792.
- Rellstab, Johann Carl Friedrich. Ueber Die Bemerkungen Eines Reisenden. Berlin, 1789.
- Sachs, Curt. Musikgeschichte Der Stadt Berlin Bis Zum Jahre 1800. Berlin, 1908.
- Salmen, Walter. Johann Friedrich Reichardt. Komponist, Schrifsteller, Kapellmeister Und Verwaltungsbeamte Der Goethezeit. 2nd ed. Hildesheim: Georg Olms, 2002.
- Schneider, Louis. Geschichte Des Königlichen Opernhauses. Berlin, 1952.
- Schottländer, Johann-Wolfgang, and Carl Friedrich Zelter. Carl Friedrich Zelters Darstellungen Seines Lebens, Zum Ersten Male Vollständig Nach Den Handschriften Herausgegeben, Schriften der Goethe-Gesellschaft; 44. Bd. Weimar: Verlag der Goethe-Gesellschaft, 1931.
- Schrenk, Oswald. Berlin Und Die Musik. 200 Jahre Musikleben Einer Stadt. 1740–1940. Berlin: Bote & Bock, 1940.
- Schünemann, Georg. Die Singakademie Zu Berlin, 1791–1941. Regensburg: G. Bosse, 1941.
- Seeger, Horst, Wolfgang Goldhan, and Germany (East). Ministerium für Kultur. Studien Zur Berliner Musikgeschichte: Eine Bestandsaufnahme. Berlin: Henschelverlag Kunst und Gesellschaft, 1988.
- Spazier, Carl. Etwas Über Gluckische Musik Und Die Oper Iphigenia in Tauris Auf Dem Berlinischen Nationaltheater. Berlin, 1795.
- Tadday, Ulrich. Die Anfänge Des Musikfeuilletons: Der Kommunikative Gebrauchswert Musikalischer Bildung in Deutschland Um 1800. Stuttgart: J.B. Metzler, 1993.
- Thouret, G. "Die Musik Am Preuss. Hofe Im 18. Jh." Hohenzollern-Jahrbuch 1 (1897): 49-70.
- Uldall, Hans. Das Klavierkonzert Der Berliner Schule, Mit Kurzem Überblick Über Seine Allgemeine Entstehungsgeschichte Und Spätere Entwicklung, Sammlung Musikwissenschaftlicher Einzeldarstellungen, 10. Heft. Leipzig: Breitkopf & Härtel, 1928.
- Wagner, Günther. "Die Anfänge Der Sing-Akademie Zu Berlin Und Ihr Frühes Repertoire." Jahrbuch des Staatlichen Instituts für Musikforschung – Preußischer Kulturbesitz (2002): 25-40.
- Weddigen, Otto. Geschichte Des Ehemaligen Königlichen Theaters in Charlottenburg. Berlin: E. Frensdorff, 1905.
- Weissmann, Adolf. Berlin Als Musikstadt; Geschichte Der Oper Und Des Konzerts Von 1740 Bis 1911. Berlin, Leipzig: Schuster & Loeffler, 1911.
- Wilhelmy-Dollinger, Petra. "Musikalische Salons in Berlin 1815–1840." Paper presented at the Die Musikveranstaltungen bei den Mendelssohns – Ein 'musikalischer Salon'? Leipzig 2006.
- Winkler, Klaus. "Alter Und Neuer Musikstil Im Streit Zwischen Den Berlinern Und Wienern Zur Zeit Der Frühklassik." Die Musikforschung 33 (1980): 37-45.
- Wollny, Peter. "'Ein Förmlicher Sebastian Und Philipp Emanuel Bach-Kultus'. Sarah Levy, Geb. Itzig, Und Ihr Musikalischer Salon." In Musik Und Ästhetik Im Berlin Moses Mendelssohns, edited by Anselm Gerhard, 217-55. Tübingen, 1999.
- Wucherpfennig, H. "Johann Friedrich Agricola. Sein Leben Und Seine Werke." Diss, 1922.
- Zelter, Carl Friedrich. Karl Friedrich Christian Fasch. Berlin: J. F. Unger, 1801.
