= Ernst Marlier =

German businessman

- Born: 28 July 1875; Coburg, Germany
- Died: 1948 (aged 72–73); Lugano, Switzerland
- Occupation: Businessman
- Known for: Building the Wannsee Villa
- Spouse: Margarete Marlier (née Wünsch) (1907-1922, divorced)

Ernst Ferdinand Emil Marlier (28 July 1875 – 1948) was a German pharmaceutical manufacturer who built the Wannsee Villa, where the Wannsee Conference was held.

== Early years ==
Ernst Marlier was the son of Philipp Marlier (died c. 1902), a postal official, and Mathilda Marlier (née Forkeln). After receiving commercial training in the Fuchs Book Factory, Marlier fulfilled his military service obligation in Infantry Regiment 22 in Kassel, after which he moved to Nuremberg. There, he was the proprietor of a shipping firm, Micado.

== Drug maker ==
In 1903, Marlier settled in Berlin (Kurfürstenstrasse 173a, later Sternstrasse 22), where he founded multiple drug firms (Chemische Fabrik Dr. Schröder GmbH, Chemische Fabrik Dr. Hartmann GmbH, Chemische Fabrik Dr. Wagner und Marlier) and the coal wholesaler Julius Marlier.

In 1905, the Pharmaceutical Institute of the University of Berlin determined that Marlier's remedies consisted primarily of tartaric acid, citric acid, sodium chloride and egg yolk.

By 1907, Marlier was already having problems with police headquarters, which warned that Marlier's preparations "did not have the properties ascribed to them in their sales information." Among the pharmaceuticals Marlier sold were Antipositin, Antineurasthin, Renascin, Slankal, Levathin, Visnervin, Vitalito and Hämasol.

== Assault charges ==
In 1904, Marlier was charged with battery and disturbance of the peace, and sentenced to six days in jail. In 1913, on the corner of Friedrichstraße and Jägerstraße, Marlier was arrested for assault and battery. According to the police, Marlier had slapped the face of a woman waiting at a cab stand. When two drivers intervened, Marlier beat them both. A policeman named Brandt saw the disturbance and approached, whereupon Marlier attacked him. According to the police report, Marlier was taken to the police precinct. A wild scene ensued, the furious Marlier accosting everyone in sight. Marlier was sentenced to pay a 600-mark fine. Marlier's wife divorced him in 1922 because he beat her.

== Wannsee Villa ==
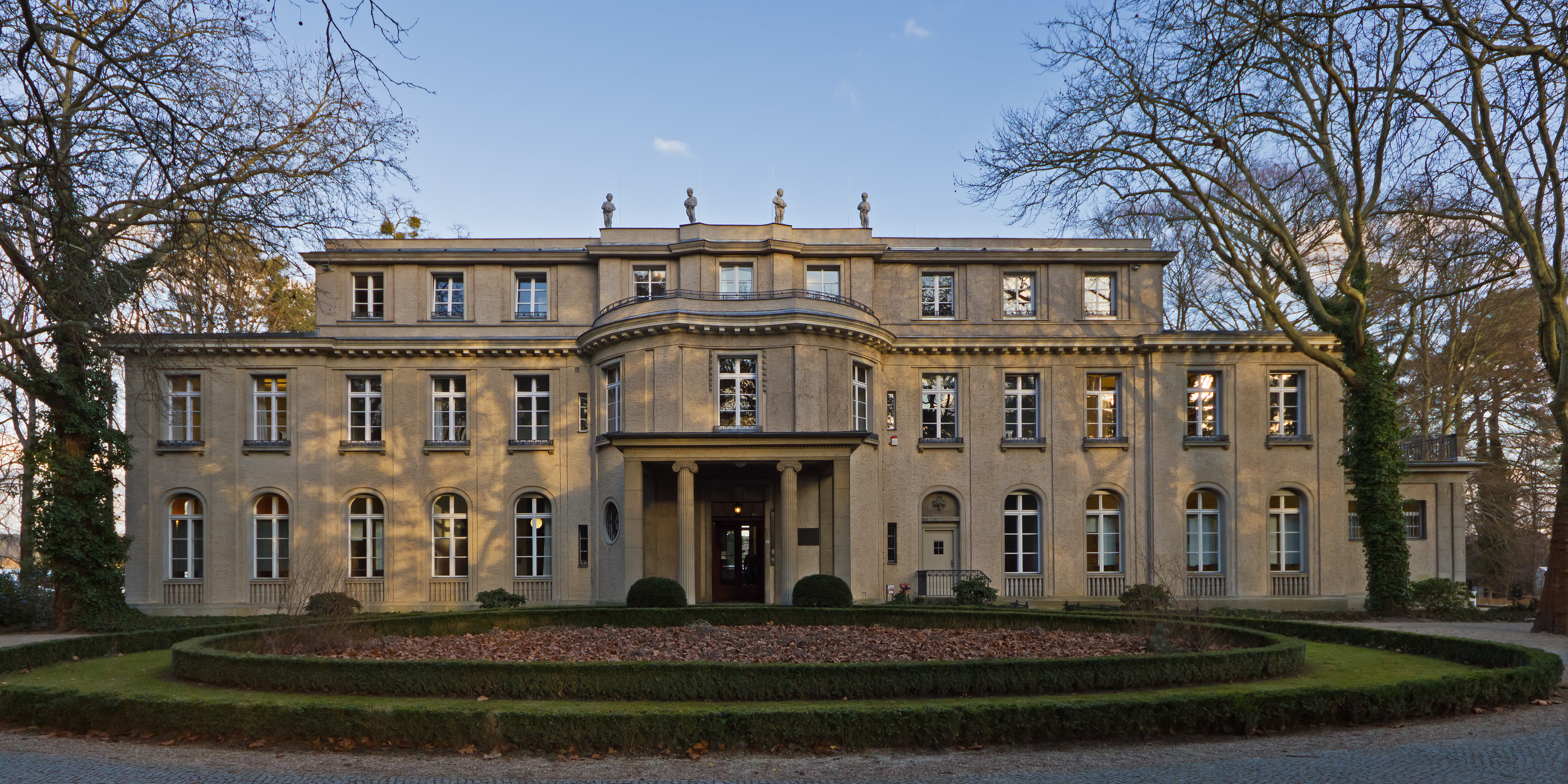
The villa at 56–58 Am Großen Wannsee, where the Wannsee Conference was held, is now a memorial and museum

In 1914, Marlier engaged architect Paul Baumgarten (later a favourite architect of Adolf Hitler) to build a magnificent villa, overlooking the Großer Wannsee, in the Berlin suburb of Wannsee. However, Marlier was unable to retain the villa because of his business problems. In 1905, the Pharmaceutical Institute of Berlin determined that Marlier's medicines consisted of nothing more than tartaric acid, citric acid, sodium chloride, and egg yolk. In 1907, the German government forbade the sale of Marlier's Antipositin and Antineurasthin. Marlier became involved in a tangle of legal troubles, and in 1921, he was forced to sell the Wannsee Villa to industrialist Friedrich Minoux for 2,300,000 reichsmarks.

== Wannsee Conference ==
On 20 January 1942, Reinhard Heydrich announced the Final Solution to the Jewish Question (the deportation and extermination of all Jews in German-occupied territory) at the Wannsee Conference, which took place in the Wannsee Villa.

== Bibliography ==
- Steven Lehrer. Wannsee House and the Holocaust. McFarland. Jefferson, N.C. 2000.
- Steven Lehrer. Hitler Sites: A City-by-city Guidebook (Austria, Germany, France, United States). McFarland. Jefferson, N.C. 2002.
