= Reich Chancellery meeting of 12 December 1941 =

Nazi Party meeting about the Holocaust

The Reich Chancellery meeting of 12 December 1941 was an encounter between Adolf Hitler and the highest-ranking officials of the Nazi Party. Almost all important party leaders were present to hear Hitler declare the ongoing destruction of the Jews, which culminated in the Holocaust. The meeting is less well-known than the later Wannsee Conference on 20 January 1942.

== Background ==
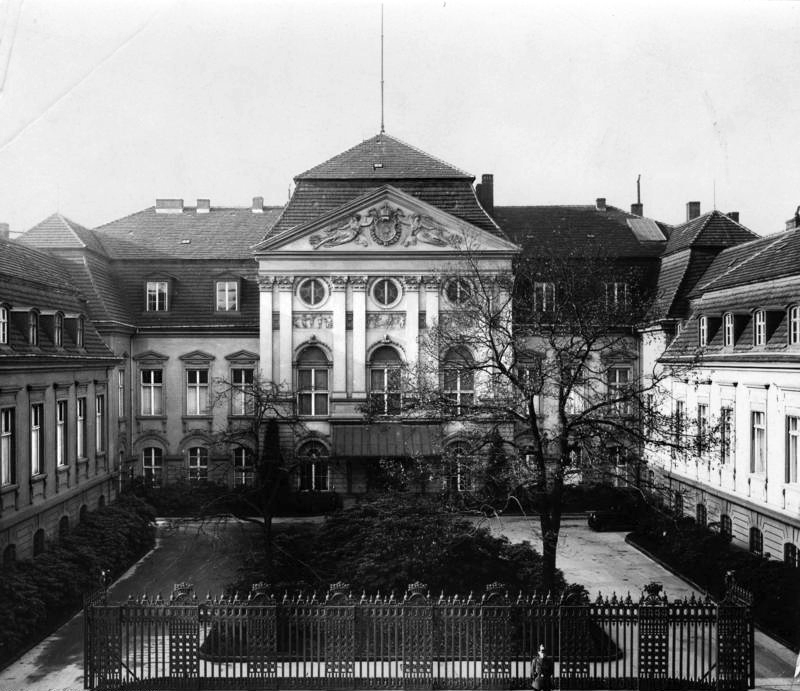
The Reich Chancellery

The announcement Hitler made on 12 December to the Reichsleiter and Gauleiter refers to an earlier statement he had made on 30 January 1939:

If the world of international financial Jewry, both in and outside of Europe, should succeed in plunging the nations into another world war, the result will not be the Bolshevization of the world and thus a victory for Judaism. The result will be the extermination of the Jewish race in Europe.

With the entry of the United States into World War II on 7 December 1941 and the declaration of war on the US by Nazi Germany on 11 December, the war, especially in regard to the above statement, had become truly a "World War". Hitler announced this declaration of war on 11 December in the German Reichstag, a speech also broadcast on German radio. On 12 December 1941, he had a meeting with the most important Nazi leaders.

== The meeting ==
On the afternoon of 12 December, Hitler ordered the leading members of the Nazi Party to a meeting in his private rooms at the Reich Chancellery. Because the meeting took place in private rooms rather than Hitler's office, no official record of it exists. However, entries in the diaries of Joseph Goebbels and Hans Frank confirm it. Goebbels made the following entry in his diary for 12 December:

Bezüglich der Judenfrage ist der Führer entschlossen, reinen Tisch zu machen. Er hat den Juden prophezeit, daß, wenn sie noch einmal einen Weltkrieg herbeiführen würden, sie dabei ihre Vernichtung erleben würden. Das ist keine Phrase gewesen. Der Weltkrieg ist da, die Vernichtung des Judentums muß die notwendige Folge sein.

Regarding the Jewish question, the Führer has decided to make a clean sweep. He prophesied to the Jews that, if they yet again brought about a world war, they would experience their own annihilation. That was not just a phrase. The world war is here, the annihilation of the Jews must be the necessary consequence.

Apart from the fact that the European war had turned into a world war, another reason for this shift was that the entry of the United States into the war meant that the Jewish population had lost its value for Hitler as hostages deterring the United States from becoming an active member of the Allied coalition, and he was finally free to act according to his long-term plans.

Hitler's presence at the Chancellery meeting undermines allegations that he was unaware of the Holocaust and that it was carried out by subordinates without his knowledge.

The meeting marked a turning point in the Nazi regime's attitude towards the Jewish people. It was part of a shift from propaganda, intimidation, and attacks to outright and planned extermination. The latter step had already been taken in some parts of Eastern Europe as early as August 1941. The better-known Wannsee Conference in January 1942 marked the next step in the Nazis' plans to exterminate the Jews.

== Attendance ==
High Nazi Party officials were obligated to attend this meeting. No official attendance list exists, but the following leaders of Nazi Germany, out of the about 50 present, are known to have been there:

- Adolf Hitler
- Heinrich Himmler
- Joseph Goebbels
- Martin Bormann
- Hans Frank
- Philipp Bouhler

In addition, Christian Gerlach writes that it is "virtually certain" that Alfred Rosenberg; Gauleiters Arthur Greiser, Fritz Bracht, and Fritz Sauckel; Reichskommissars Hinrich Lohse and Erich Koch; and Alfred Meyer were present.

Known to have been absent from this meeting were Hermann Göring and probably Reinhard Heydrich.

== Sources ==
- Aly, Götz (13 December 1997). "December 12, 1941". Berliner Zeitung. (in German)
- Bedürftig, Friedemann (January 2001). "Von vorn herein wörtlich gemeint: Hitler's "Prophezeiung" des Völkermords an den Juden". Die Gazette (in German).
- Cesarani, David; Kavanaugh, Sarah (2004). The Holocaust: Critical Concepts in Historical Studies. Routledge. ISBN 978-0-415-27509-5.
- Longerich, Peter (2010). Holocaust: The Nazi Persecution and Murder of the Jews. Oxford; New York: Oxford University Press. ISBN 978-0-19-280436-5.
- Rubenstein, Richard; Roth, John (2003). Approaches to Auschwitz, Revised Edition: The Holocaust and Its Legacy. Westminster John Knox Press. ISBN 9781611642148.
