= The Reich Chancellery and Führerbunker Complex =

2006 book by Steven Lehrer

- Author: Steven Lehrer
- Original title: The Reich Chancellery and Führerbunker Complex: An Illustrated History of the Seat of the Nazi Regime
- Language: English
- Published: 2006 (McFarland & Company)
- Publication place: United States
- Media type: Print (Hardcover)
- Pages: 214 (hardcover edition)
- ISBN: 978-0-7864-2393-4 (hardcover edition)
- Preceded by: Hitler Sites

The Reich Chancellery and Führerbunker Complex: An Illustrated History of the Seat of the Nazi Regime is a 2006 book by Steven Lehrer, in which Lehrer recounts the history of a group of Berlin buildings, from their construction in the 18th century until their complete destruction during and after World War II.

Chopin playing piano in Radziwill's Berlin salon at Palais Radziwill (Henryk Siemiradzki, 1887)

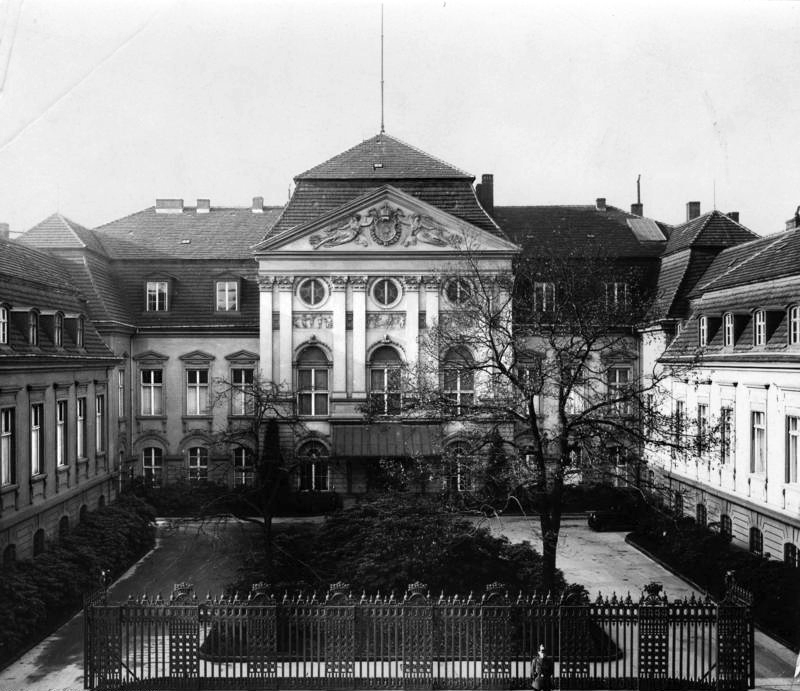
Old Reich Chancellery - formerly Palais Schulenburg

King Frederick William I of Prussia built the Palais Schulenburg, at Wilhelmstraße 77, for his esteemed Lieutenant General Count Adolph Friedrich von der Schulenburg.

Later the Palais had a more distinguished owner, Prince Anton Radziwill, a Polish nobleman, aristocrat, musician and politician in Prussia. A guest at the Palais Radziwill was Polish composer and virtuoso pianist Frédéric Chopin.

During the Napoleonic Wars, Marshal Victor, the French Governor in Berlin, occupied the Palais.

In 1875, the feuding Radziwill heirs sold the Palais to the German Reich.

It became the Reichskanzlerpalais, the Chancellery of Otto von Bismarck and subsequent German Chancellors, the last being Adolf Hitler.

Though Hitler lived in the old Chancellery when he was in Berlin, he ordered the building of a larger, grander structure, the New Reich Chancellery, completed January 1939. Hitler's Reich Chancellery was not only a center of government but, in Winston Churchill’s words, the hub of "a monstrous tyranny never surpassed in the dark, lamentable catalogue of human crime."

In April 1945, as the Soviet Red Army closed in, Hitler and his mistress, Eva Braun, committed suicide together in the Führerbunker, which Hitler had built under the Chancellery garden.
