= Klaus Hoffmann =

German singer, songwriter and actor (born 1951)

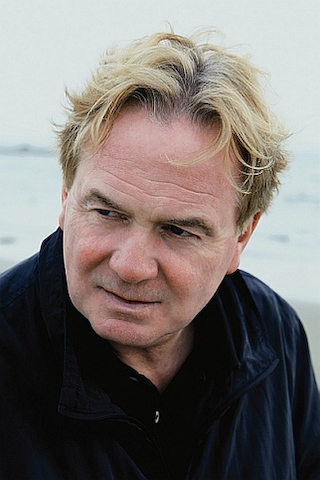
- Hoffmann in 2007
- Born: March 26, 1951 (age 74); West Berlin, West Germany

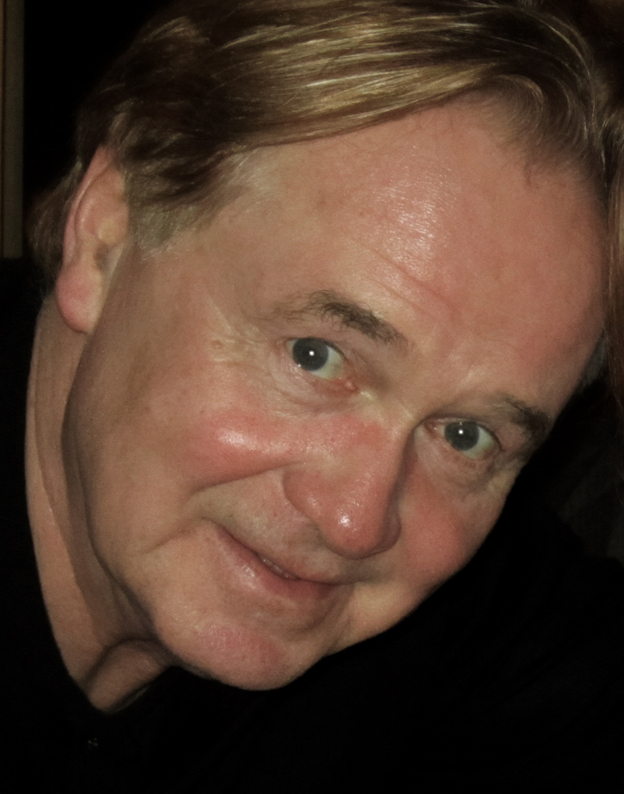
Klaus Hoffmann 2012

Klaus Hoffmann (born 26 March 1951, West Berlin) is a German singer, songwriter and actor.

== Career ==
Klaus Hoffmann started his career as a singer-songwriter during the late 1960s in the alternative Berlin club culture. After travelling to Afghanistan in 1969, he began training as an actor at the Berlin Max-Reinhardt-Schule für Schauspiel.

Since 1974, Hoffmann has starred in several renowned theatre and television productions. He became famous for his portrayal of Edgar Wibeau in the 1976 film adaptation of Ulrich Plenzdorfs Die neuen Leiden des jungen W., for which performance he won several German film awards.

While working as an actor, Hoffmann continued to pursue a career as a singer-songwriter. He released his first album in 1974 and has since recorded more than 30 albums. He regularly performs live and has won several prestigious German music awards.

Hoffmann’s songs are characterised by their sophisticated, sensitive and descriptive lyrics. Rooted in his childhood in working class, post war Berlin and his teenage years during the 1968 student uprisings, Hoffmann’s lyrics often reflect on the inner conflict between the warmth and security of the familiar and the freedom and possibilities of the unknown. He has gained recognition for his songs about his hometown of Berlin – "Berlin", "Was fang ich an in dieser Stadt?" ("What am I supposed to do in this town?"), "Kreuzberger Walzer" ("Kreuzberg Waltz") – which rank him among the representatives of the Berlin Chanson tradition along with German artists Hildegard Knef and Harald Juhnke.

Together with his wife Malene Steger, Hoffmann lives in his hometown of Berlin.

== Brel interpreter ==
Hoffmann is considered the leading German interpreter of the Belgian chansonnier Jacques Brel. His repertoire includes a wide range of adaptations of Brel's chansons. In 1997, Hoffmann's musical Brel – die letzte Vorstellung (Brel – the last performance), which he had written with permission of Therese Brel, the widow of Jacques Brel, received its world premiere. Hoffmann performed his program "Klaus Hoffmann singt Jacques Brel" in the Maison Heinrich Heine in Paris on 9 October 2008, the 30th anniversary of the death of Jacques Brel.
