= Wannsee House and the Holocaust =

Book by Steven Lehrer

- Author: Steven Lehrer
- Original title: Wannsee House and the Holocaust
- Language: English
- Genre: Nonfiction/History
- Publisher: McFarland & Company
- Publication date: 2000
- Publication place: United States
- Media type: Print (Paperback)
- Pages: 196 pp (Paperback edition)
- ISBN: 0-7864-4092-9 (Paperback edition)
- Followed by: Hitler Sites

Wannsee House and the Holocaust by Steven Lehrer tells the story of the elegant suburban Berlin villa where the Wannsee Conference took place on January 20, 1942. At that meeting, Reinhard Heydrich announced the plans for the deportation and extermination of all Jews in German-occupied territory. This to be coordinated with the representatives from the Nazi state agencies present at the meeting.

A prosperous drug manufacturer, Ernst Marlier, built the Wannsee Villa in 1914, but was forced to sell in 1921 because of business and legal problems. The buyer was Friedrich Minoux, a wealthy German industrialist and partner of Hugo Stinnes. Minoux was later convicted of swindling the Berlin Gasworks, the largest fraud of the Nazi era. From his jail cell in Berlin, Minoux sold the Wannsee Villa to the Stiftung Nordhav, a foundation controlled by Reinhard Heydrich, whose Berlin home was nearby. After World War II, a Holocaust survivor and historian, Joseph Wulf, campaigned in vain to have the Wannsee Villa made into a Holocaust memorial. Bitterly frustrated, Wulf committed suicide in 1974. In 1992, the Berlin Senate finally made the Wannsee Villa into a memorial.

"The German decision to make the Wannsee House a shrine to victims is another part of the society's effort to remember its past. This book ensures that Wannsee will not be forgotten."
