= Wohlstandskinder =

German punk rock band

- Also known as: WSK, W$K
- Origin: Overath, Germany
- Genres: Punk rock
- Years active: 1995–2005
- Past members: Honolulu Silver; Türk Travolta; Raki Neidhardt; Don Ludger de la Cardeneo

The Wohlstandskinder (German pronunciation: [ˈvoːlʃtantskɪndɐ], "Children of prosperity", shortform WSK or W$K) was a punk rock band from Overath near Cologne, Germany that was founded in 1995. They define their music as Provinzrock ("Province rock"). After their 10th anniversary in December 2005 they produced a double-live-album, which was also released as DVD.

== Name ==
"The" was added to the band name in 2000, according to the official statement on their website as an Adelsprädikat ("an ennobling descriptor") and as sign for Posertum and Möchtegernglamour ("Wannabe-glamour").

== Members ==
The Wohlstandskinder are:

- Honolulu Silver – vocals, guitar
- Türk Travolta – lead guitar
- Raki Neidhardt – bass
- Don Ludger de la Cardeneo – drums

== Discography ==
The Wohlstandskinder published several singles and five studio albums. They have also been sampled several times.

They have recorded two music-videos (Wie ein Stern and Kein Radiosong), the last one was even shown on the German music-television station VIVA (but only very late in the evening).

On their tours they promoted bands like Sum 41, The Offspring, Die Happy and Donots.

=== Demos ===
- 1996: Mit Sex verkauft sich alles -Demo (Sex sells everything)

=== LPs ===
- 1997: Für Recht und Ordnung (For Right and order)
- 1997: Poppxapank
- 1999: Delikatessen 500sl (delicatesses 500sl)
- 2000: En Garde
- 2002: Baby, Blau! (Baby, blue)
- 2003: Poppxapank + Die 90er waren zum Recyclen da (Re- release)
- 2004: Dezibelkarate
- 2005: Zwischen Image und Gewohnheit (Between image and habits)/live

=== EPs ===
- 1998: Die 90er waren zum Recyclen da (The 90s had to be used for recycling)
- 2001: Untot macht hirnpolitisch - EP (undead makes brainpolitical) (under the nickname "Kinderkacke", which means in English "unimportant", lit. children poo)

=== Singles ===
- 2002: Wir sehen uns in Las Vegas (We'll meet again in Las Vegas)
- 2003: Wie ein Stern (Like a star)
- 2004: Kein Radiosong (No radio song) (not released)

=== VHS & DVD ===
- Wie ein Stern 2002 (Like a star, VHS)
- Zwischen Image und Gewohnheit" (Between image and habits)/live (DVD)
