= Vicki Vomit =

German satirical musician and comedian

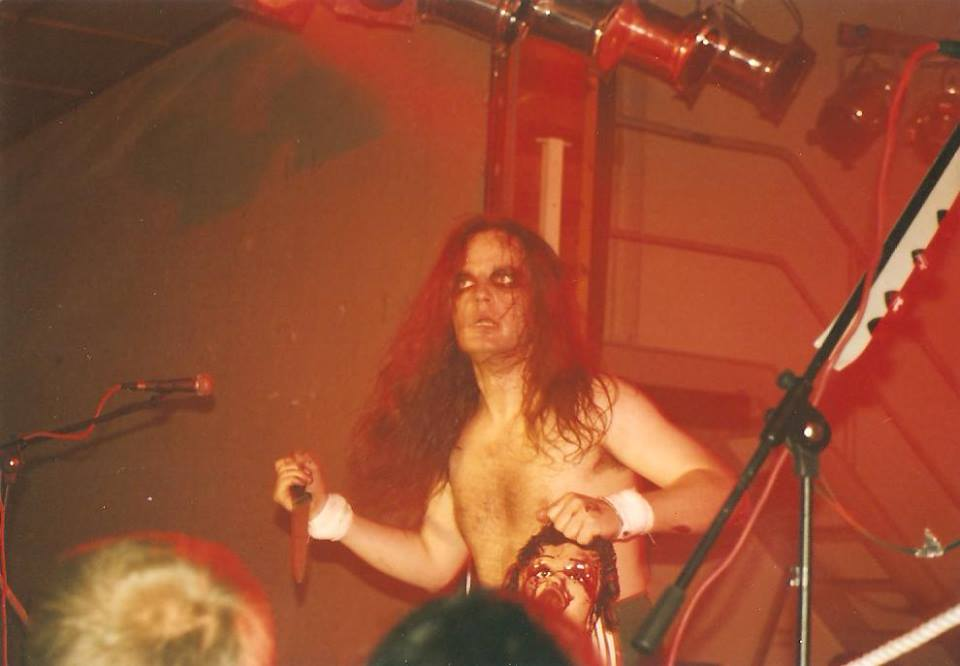
Vicki Vomit during a show in 1997.

Vicki Vomit (born Jens Hellmann; July 9, 1963) is a German former satirical musician and comedian based in Erfurt, Germany. He was a member of the German heavy metal band Blitzz, which released one album with Steamhammer/SPV in 1989, Do the Blitzz. He is also the cousin of Tamara Danz, the lead singer of the rock band Silly. He is currently retired and working as a writer.

== Works ==
Albums

- Ein Schritt nach vorn (1994)
- Ich mach's für Geld (1996)
- Die fäkalischen Verse (1996)
- Bumm Bumm (1997)
- Kuschelpunk 5 (1998)
- Ficken für Deutschland (2001)
- Wir bekommen ein Ei (2001)
- Wollmonster (2003)
- Doomjazz (2005) – Released with two discs
- Für'n Appel und 'n Ei (2006)
- Für weniger als wie für 'n Appel und 'n Ei (2011)
- Ich freu mich wie 'n Pferd (2012)
- STRC - PRST - SKRZ - KRK! (2013)

DVDs

- Vicki Vomit – Live (2004)
- Die Globale Erwärmung - unser Weg aus der Krise (2007)
- Diplomkomiker (2008)
- Zwanzig Jahre Unfug (2012)

Books

- Vicki Vomit - Mein Klampf (2024)
- Fotze Fotze Hitler (2026)
