= Hitler Sites =

Book by Steven Lehrer

- Author: Steven Lehrer
- Original title: Hitler Sites: A City-by-City Guidebook (Austria, Germany, France, United States)
- Language: English
- Genre: Nonfiction/History
- Published: 2005 (McFarland & Company)
- Publication place: United States
- Media type: Print (Paperback)
- Pages: 224 (paperback edition)
- ISBN: 978-0-7864-2454-2 (paperback edition)
- Preceded by: Wannsee House and the Holocaust
- Followed by: The Reich Chancellery and Führerbunker Complex

Hitler Sites: A City-by-City Guidebook (Austria, Germany, France, United States) by Steven Lehrer is a history and tour of European and American sites related to Adolf Hitler These sites cannot be found in standard guidebooks. Their descriptions comprise a topographical biography of the German dictator and can clarify who and what he actually was. Among the many sites are the middle-class homes and apartments where he grew up in rural Austria and Linz; the tenements and shelters he inhabited before ending up homeless, lice-infested, freezing and penniless in the streets of Vienna; the expansive Munich apartment where he lived as a rising politician and as Führer; and his country home, the Berghof, in Berchtesgaden. Also included are the Führerbau, where he signed the Munich Accords, and the New York home of his reviled nephew, William Patrick Hitler, who enlisted in the US Navy to fight against his uncle during World War II.
