= Friedrich Minoux =

German businessman (1877–1945)

- Born: 21 March 1877; Mutterstadt, German Empire
- Died: 16 October 1945 (aged 68); Berlin, Germany
- Occupations: Industrialist, financier
- Known for: Wannsee House; Berlin Gasworks fraud

Friedrich Minoux (21 March 1877 – 16 October 1945) was a German industrialist and financier who is best known for being one of the owners of the Wannsee House, where the namesake conference that would decide the fate of millions at the hands of the Nazis during World War II was held in early 1942.

== Early life ==
Born in the Pfalz region to Michael and Margaretha (née Reffert) Minoux, Friedrich Minoux attended Gymnasien in Speyer and Mannheim as was customary for boys at the time. After fulfilling his military obligations in 1893, he married Maria Karoline Hente, and took a job at the Essen Gas and Water Works company, where he would rise to the position of financial vice president. In 1912, Minoux became an employee of Hugo Stinnes, a prominent German industrialist of the time.

Minoux achieved considerable financial success while working for Stinnes, at one point earning as much as 350,000 gold marks per year — a substantial sum at the time. In 1919 Minoux became a member of the board of the United Citizens of Berlin Coal Dealers AG, and began to diversify his business interests to paper production, automobile manufacturing and coal and steel production. In 1923 Minoux left the Stinnes conglomerate to build his own industrial empire. In 1926 he acquired half of the shares of the German-Romanian Petroleum Company AG (Derupag). His main source of income at the time became The Friedrich Minoux Society for Trade and Industry, which was a coal wholesale business. Minoux was also one of the founders of the Citizens of Berlin Urban Power Stations AG, an electric company. By 1938, in his last major business deal, Minoux purchased the Jewish-owned Offenheimer Cellulose and Paper Works company for less than 1 million reichsmarks. The actual value was more than RM12 million, but by that time Nazi actions against Jewish businesses had intensified, and the owner of the mill was forced to sell to Minoux for a pittance. Throughout those years, Minoux and his wife became notable figures in German political and social circles.

== Wannsee House and political ambitions ==
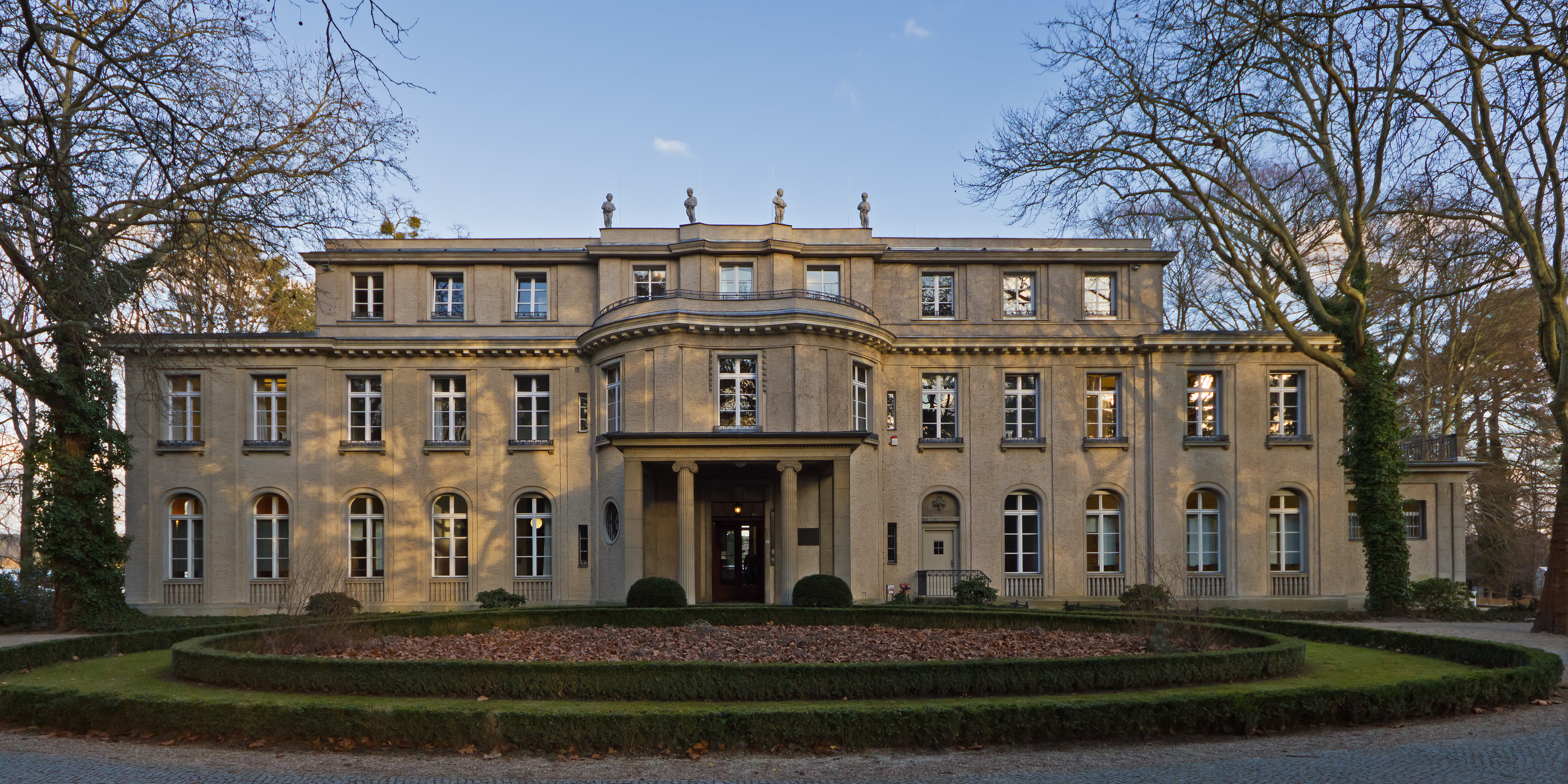
Wannsee House today

Minoux opposed the Weimar Republic and maintained contacts with right-wing extremists, military federations, and politicians. In 1931 he became a member of the Society for the Study of Fascism, and two years later he would be elected into the Academy for German Law. In 1921, Minoux purchased the Wannsee House (also called Wannsee Villa), which was originally built in the outskirts of Berlin by Ernst Marlier. Fritz Thyssen wrote in his memoirs I Paid Hitler that Minoux had already financed the NSDAP from 1923.

In 1923, during the height of the economic crisis that would eventually cause the collapse of the Weimar Republic and the rise of the Third Reich, Minoux offered his assistance to the German Army High Command in exchange for a cabinet-level position in the coming government. His ambitions would not come to fruition. That same year, the army abandoned plans for a putsch against the government, and talks between Minoux and the Nazis eventually collapsed.

On 15 August 1941 Minoux was convicted of defrauding the Berlin Gasworks. At the time this was considered the largest business swindle of the Nazi era. He was sentenced to five years imprisonment and hefty fines. From his jail cell in Berlin, Minoux sold Wannsee House to the Stiftung Nordhav, a foundation controlled by Reinhard Heydrich. Subsequently, the property became an important center of operations for the SS Security Service and the Reich Security Main Office. It was there that the Wannsee Conference would eventually be held on 20 January 1942. Today the villa is a museum dedicated to the remembrance of the Holocaust.

Minoux died of starvation a few months after the Allies liberated him from Brandenburg prison in 1945. He was buried in an unmarked grave in the Alter Friedhof on Lindenstraße in Wannsee.

== Bibliography ==
- Lehrer, Steven (2000). Wannsee House and the Holocaust. McFarland. p. 196. ISBN 978-0-7864-0792-7.
- Lehrer, Steven (2002). Hitler Sites: A City-by-city Guidebook (Austria, Germany, France, United States). McFarland. p. 224. ISBN 0-7864-1045-0.
