= Ichinomiya, Aichi =

Ichinomiya 一宮市
- Core city
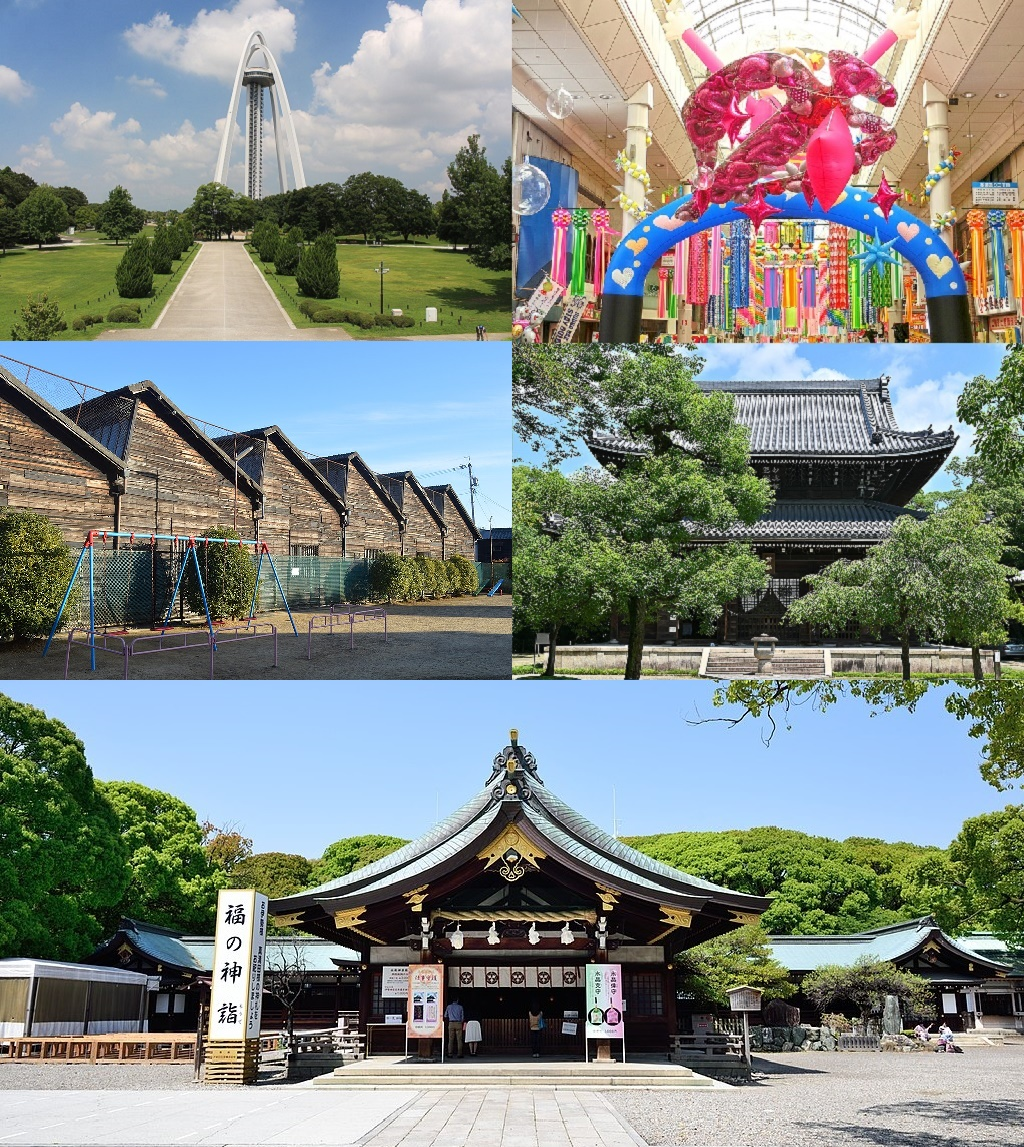
Twin Arch 138	Ichinomiya Tanabata Festival
Bisyu Woven fabric factory	Myōkō-ji temple
Masumida Shrine （Owari Ichinomiya）
- Flag Coat of arms

- Location of Ichinomiya in Aichi Prefecture

- Coordinates: 35°18′14″N 136°48′11″E
- Country: Japan
- Region: Chūbu (Tōkai)
- Prefecture: Aichi
- First official recorded: 60 AD
- City Settled: September 1, 1921

Government
  - Mayor: Masayasu Nakano (from February 2015)

Area
  - Total: 113.82 km^{2} (43.95 sq mi)

Population (2020)
  - Total: 380,073
  - Density: 3,339.2/km^{2} (8,648.6/sq mi)
- Time zone: UTC+9 (Japan Standard Time)
  - Tree: Round-Leaf Holly
  - Flower: Chinese bellflower
- Phone number: 0586-28-8100
- Address: 2-5-6 Honmachi, Ichinomiya-shi, Aichi-ken 491-8501
- Website: Official website

Ichinomiya (一宮市, Ichinomiya-shi; Japanese pronunciation: [ì.c̟͡ɕí.nó̞.mʲì.jä̀, -mʲí.jä́.ɕì]) is a city located in Aichi Prefecture, Japan. The city is sometimes called Owarichinomiya to avoid confusion with other municipalities of the same name, including Ichinomiya (now part of the city of Toyokawa) and Ichinomiya in Chiba Prefecture. As of 1 October 2019, the city had an estimated population of 379,654 in 161,434 households, and a population density of 3,336 persons per km^{2}. The total area of the city was 113.82 square kilometres (43.95 sq mi).

== Geography ==
Ichinomiya is situated in western Aichi Prefecture, bordered by Gifu Prefecture to the west. The Kiso River and the Gojō River both flow through the city.

=== Climate ===
The city has a climate characterized by hot and humid summers, and relatively mild winters (Köppen climate classification Cfa). The average annual temperature in Ichinomiya is 15.6 °C. The average annual rainfall is 1833 mm with September as the wettest month. The temperatures are highest on average in August, at around 28.1 °C, and lowest in January, at around 4.2 °C.

=== Demographics ===
Per Japanese census data, the population of Ichinomiya has increased steadily over the past 70 years.

Historical population
Year	Pop.	±%
1940	162,599	—
1950	187,706	+15.4%
1960	258,126	+37.5%
1970	296,141	+14.7%
1980	335,465	+13.3%
1990	346,972	+3.4%
2000	362,726	+4.5%
2010	375,621	+3.6%

=== Neighboring municipalities ===
Aichi Prefecture

- Inazawa
- Iwakura
- Kitanagoya
- Kiyosu
- Kōnan

Gifu Prefecture

- Ginan
- Hashima
- Kakamigahara
- Kasamatsu

=== City scape ===
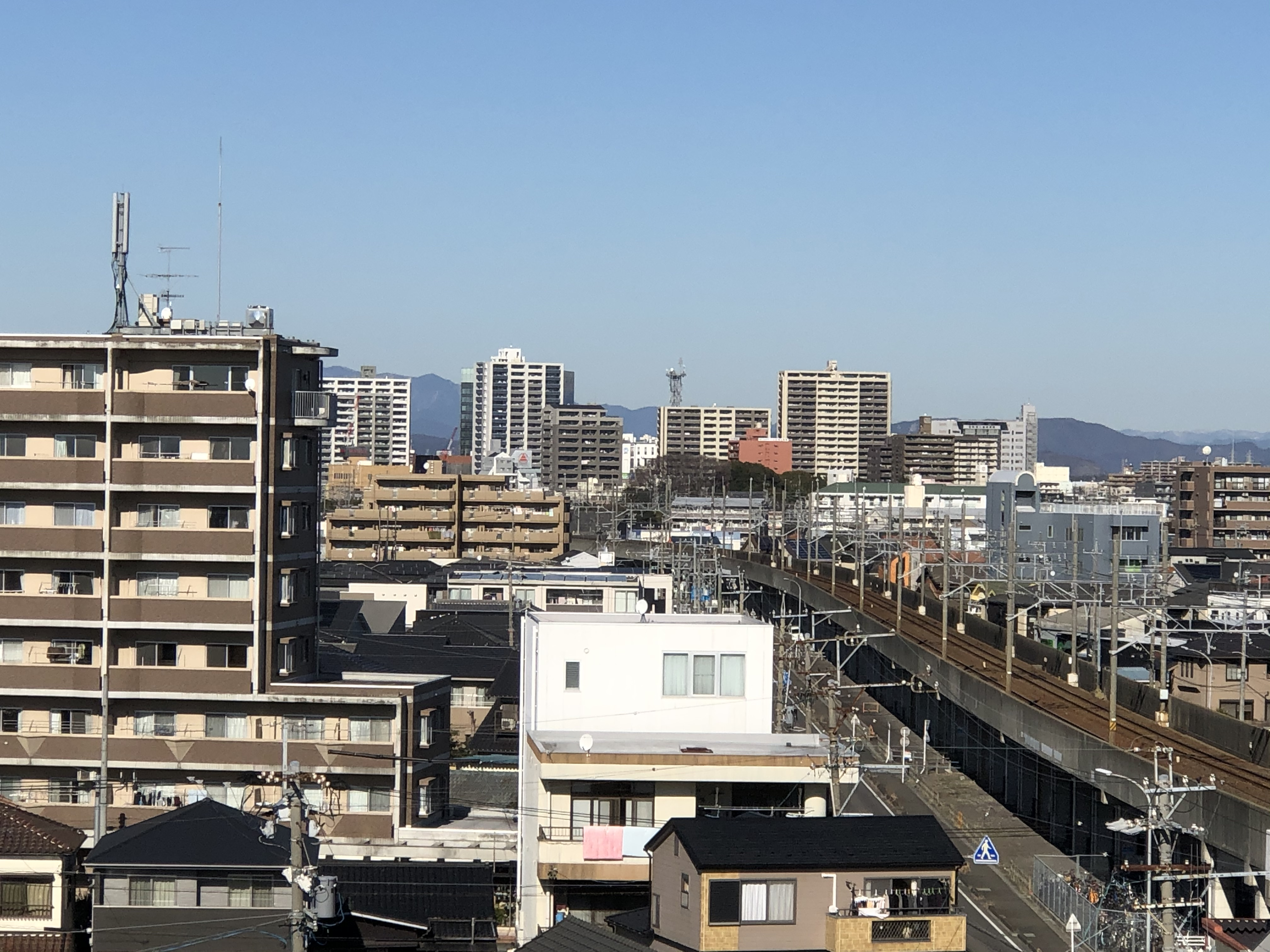
Skyline of Ichinomiya City

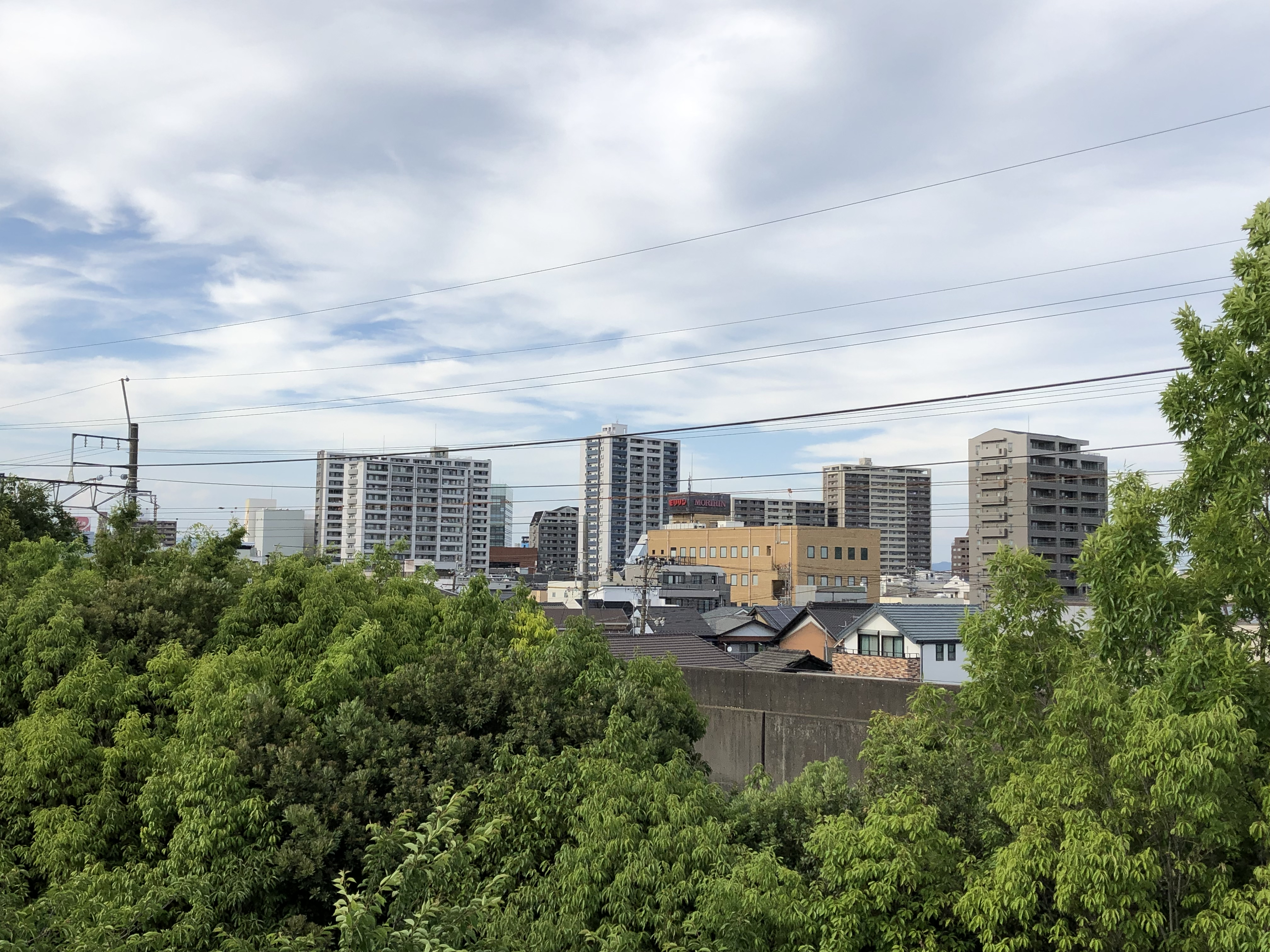
Skyline of Owari-Ichinomiya

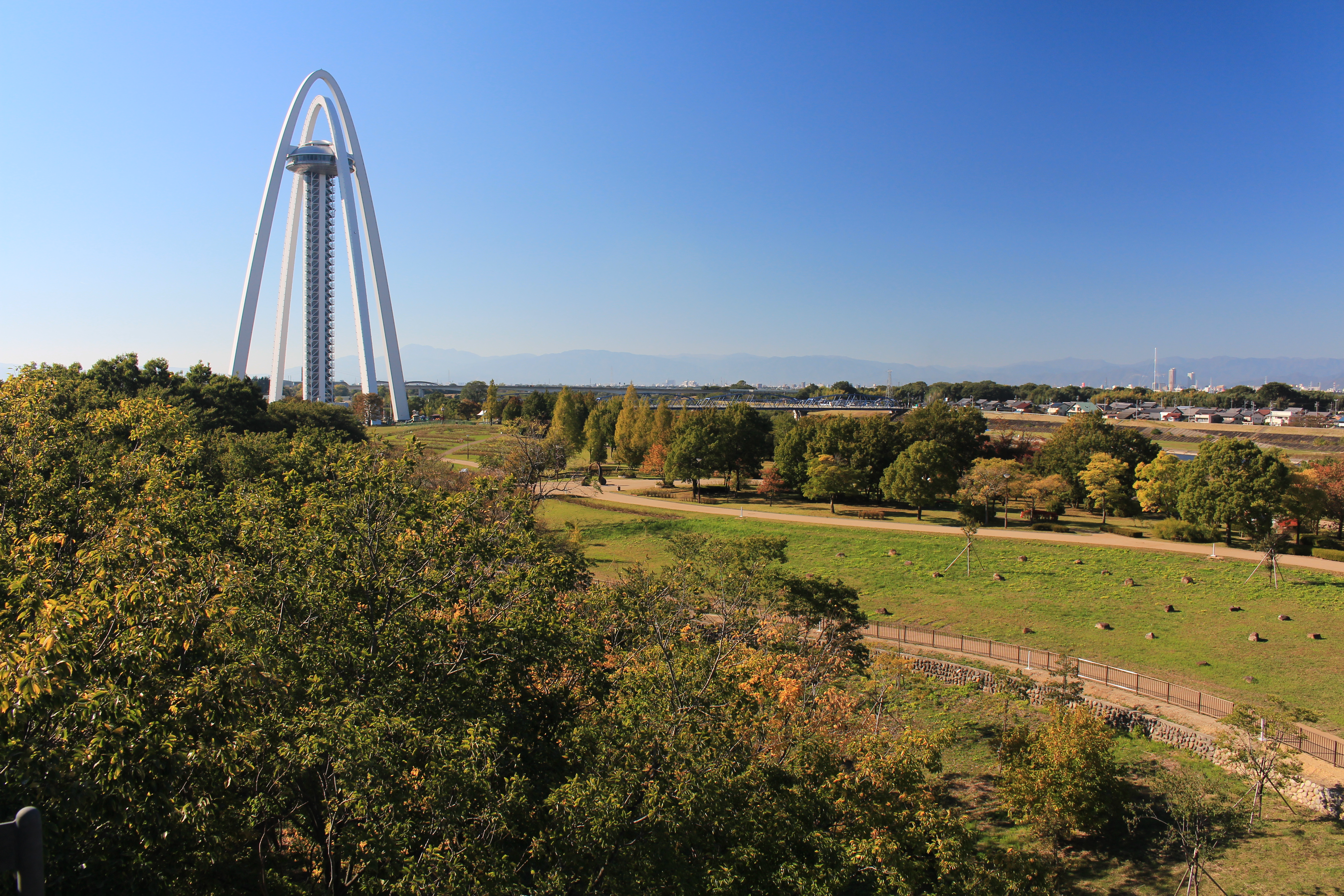
138 Tower Park

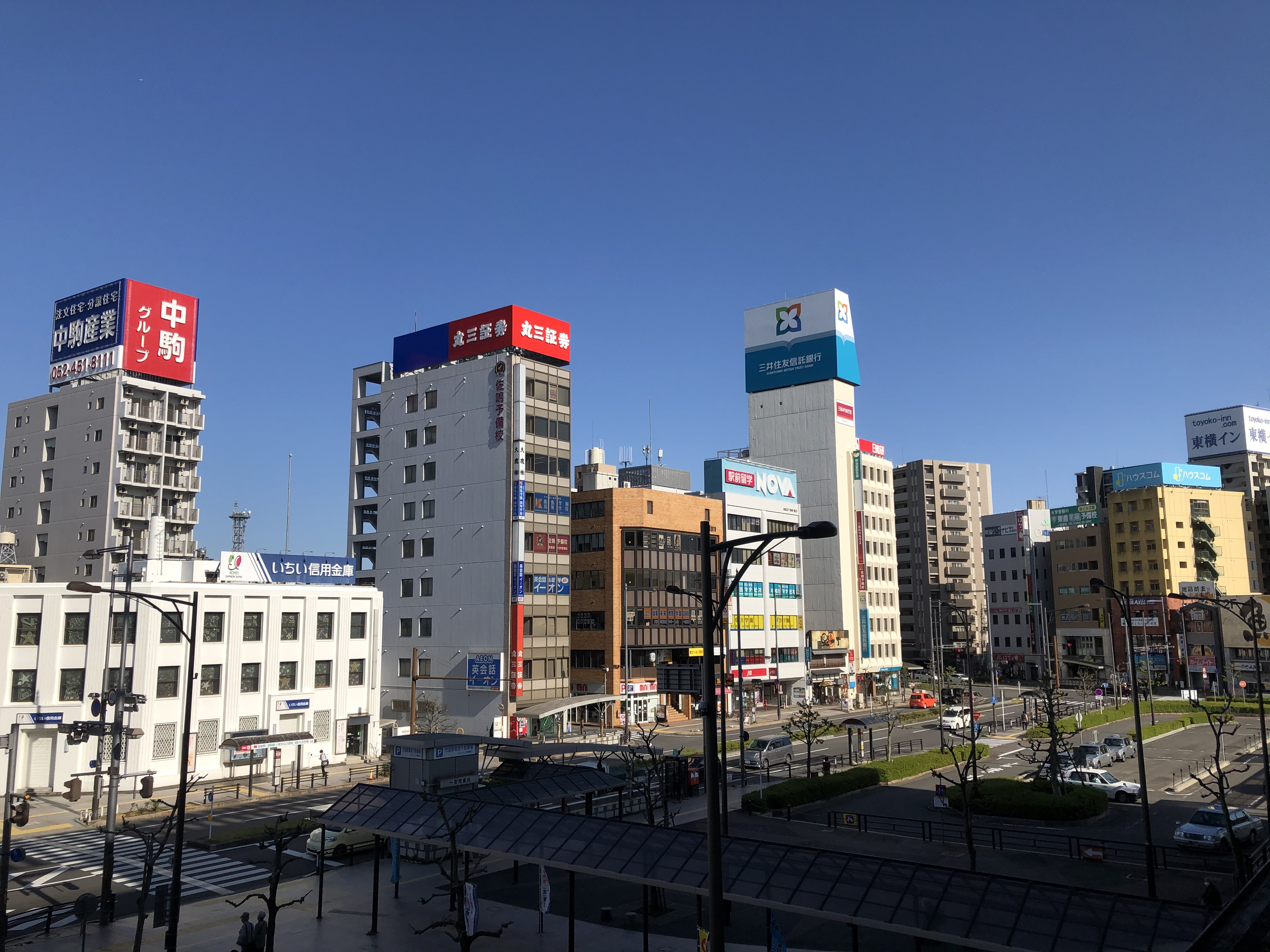
Downtown of Ichinomiya

== History ==
=== Origins ===
"Ichinomiya" literally means "the first shrine" of a province.

=== Ancient history ===
In case of Owari Province, this was Masumida Shrine, which dates to the Nara period and was located close to the provincial capital in what is now the city of Inazawa.

=== Feudal period ===
Ichinomiya developed as a monzen-machi from the Heian period and was part of the holdings of Owari Domain under the Edo period Tokugawa Shogunate.

=== Late modern period ===
==== Meiji period ====
In the early Meiji period, with the establishment of the modern municipalities system on April 1, 1889, the town of Ichinomiya was created within Nakashima District

Ichinomiya was raised to city status on September 1, 1921.

=== Contemporary history ===
==== Modern Ichinomiya ====
The city annexed the neighboring villages of Haguri and Nishinari in 1940, and with an additional eight surrounding municipalities (the villages of Chiaki, Tanyo, and Kitakata, and the towns of Asai, Yamato, Akiwara, Oku and a portion of Imaise) in 1955.

On April 1, 2002, Ichinomiya was designated as a special city, with increased local autonomy.

On April 1, 2005, the city was further expanded by absorbing the city of Bisai, and the town of Kisogawa (from Haguri District) which made it the fourth largest in Aichi Prefecture, after Nagoya, Toyota, and Toyohashi.

On April 1, 2021, Ichinomiya was designated as a core city, with increased local autonomy.

== Government ==
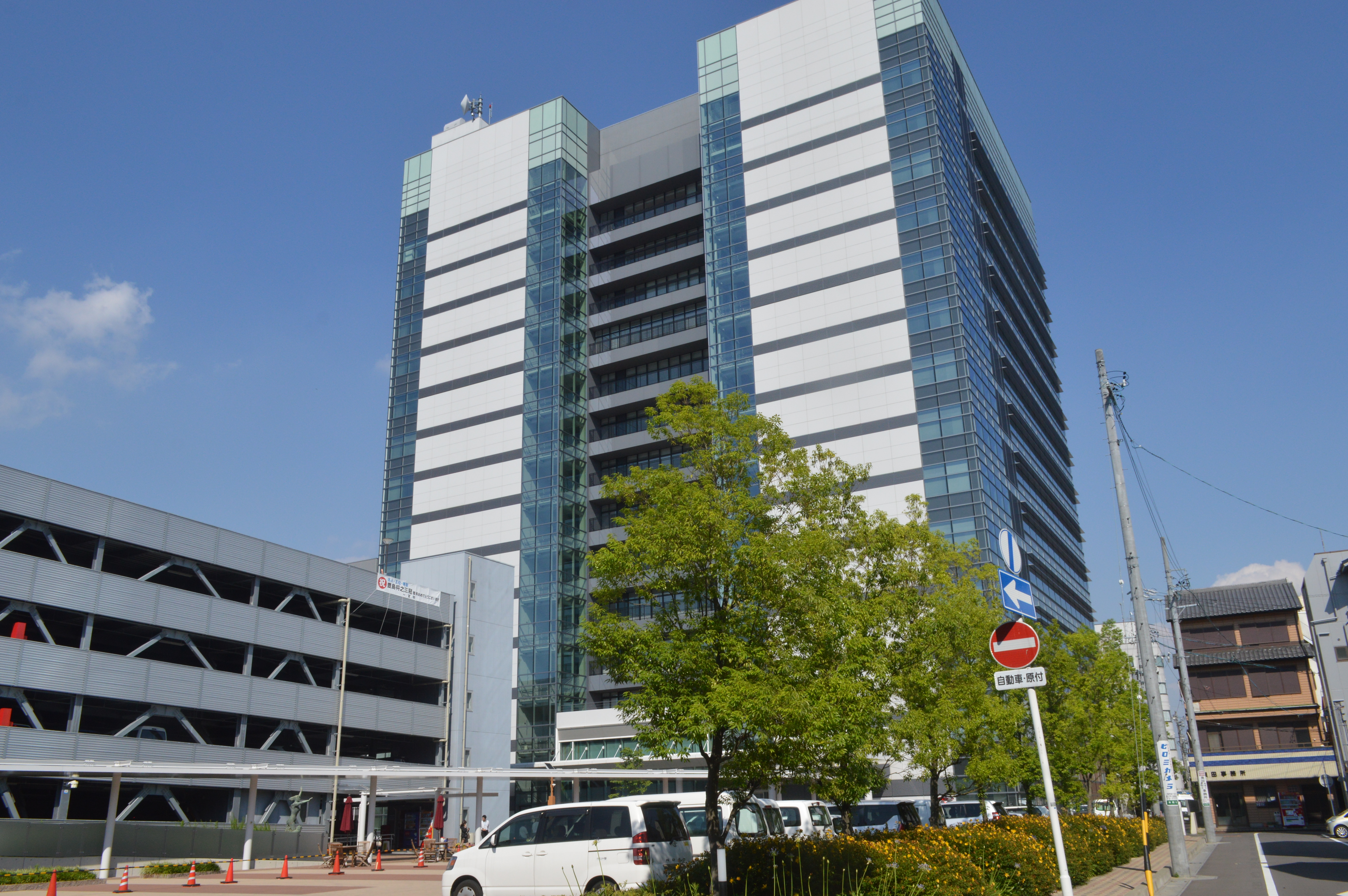
Ichinomiya City hall

=== Mayor-council ===
Ichinomiya has a mayor-council form of government with a directly elected mayor and a unicameral city legislature of 38 members.

=== Prefectural Assembly ===
The city contributes five members to the Aichi Prefectural Assembly.

=== House of Representatives ===
In terms of national politics, the city is divided between Aichi District 9 and Aichi District 10 of the lower house of the Diet of Japan.

== Public ==
=== Police ===
- Aichi Prefectural Police
  - Ichinomiya police station

=== Firefighting ===
- Fire department
  - Ichinomiya fire department

=== Health care ===
- Hospital
  - Ichinomiya Municipal Hospital
  - Kisogawa Municipal Hospital

=== Post office ===
- Bisai Post office
- Ichinomiya Post office

=== Library ===
- Ichinomiya City Library
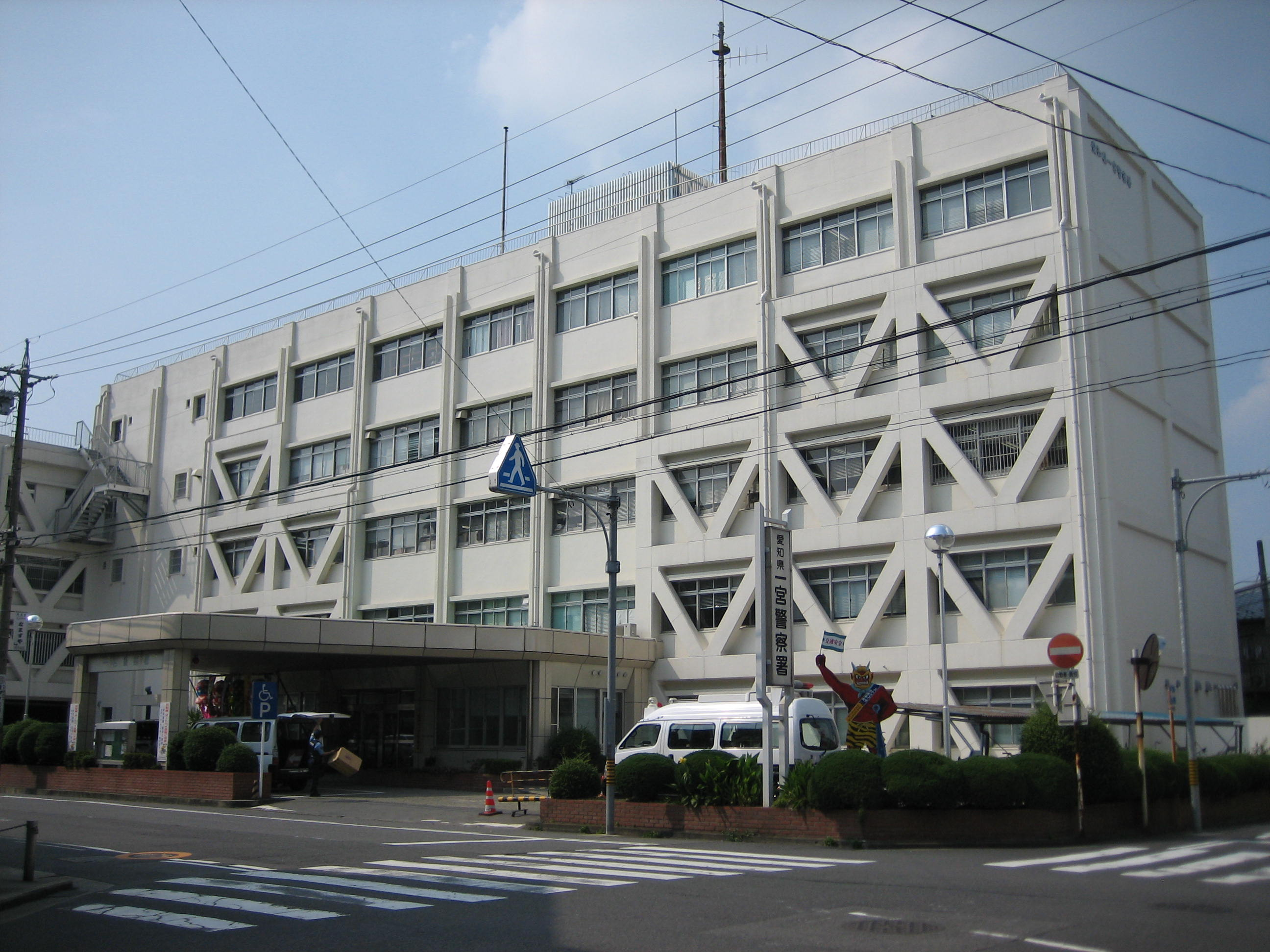
Ichinomiya Police Station

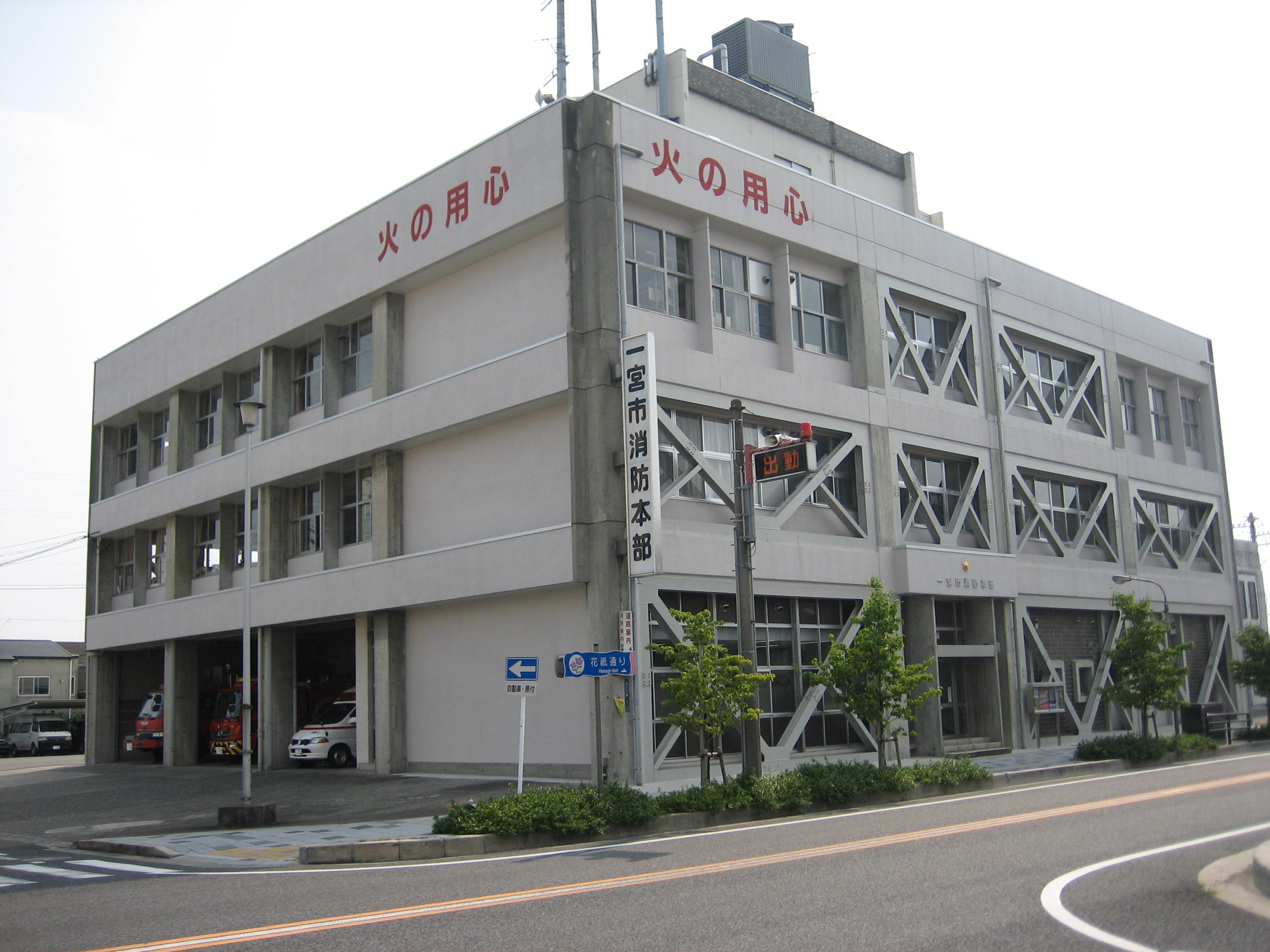
Ichinomiya Fire Department

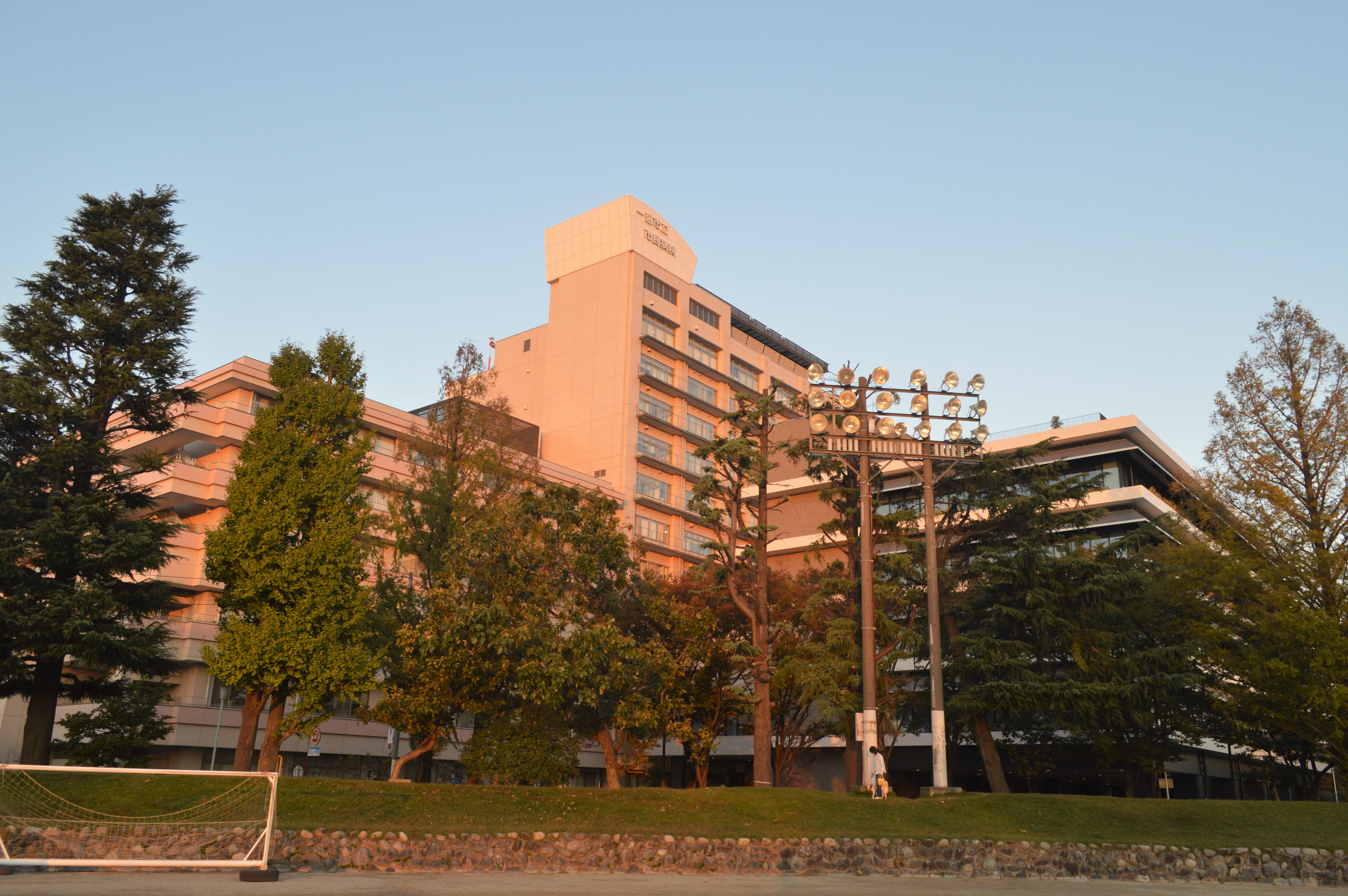
Ichinomiya Municipal Hospital

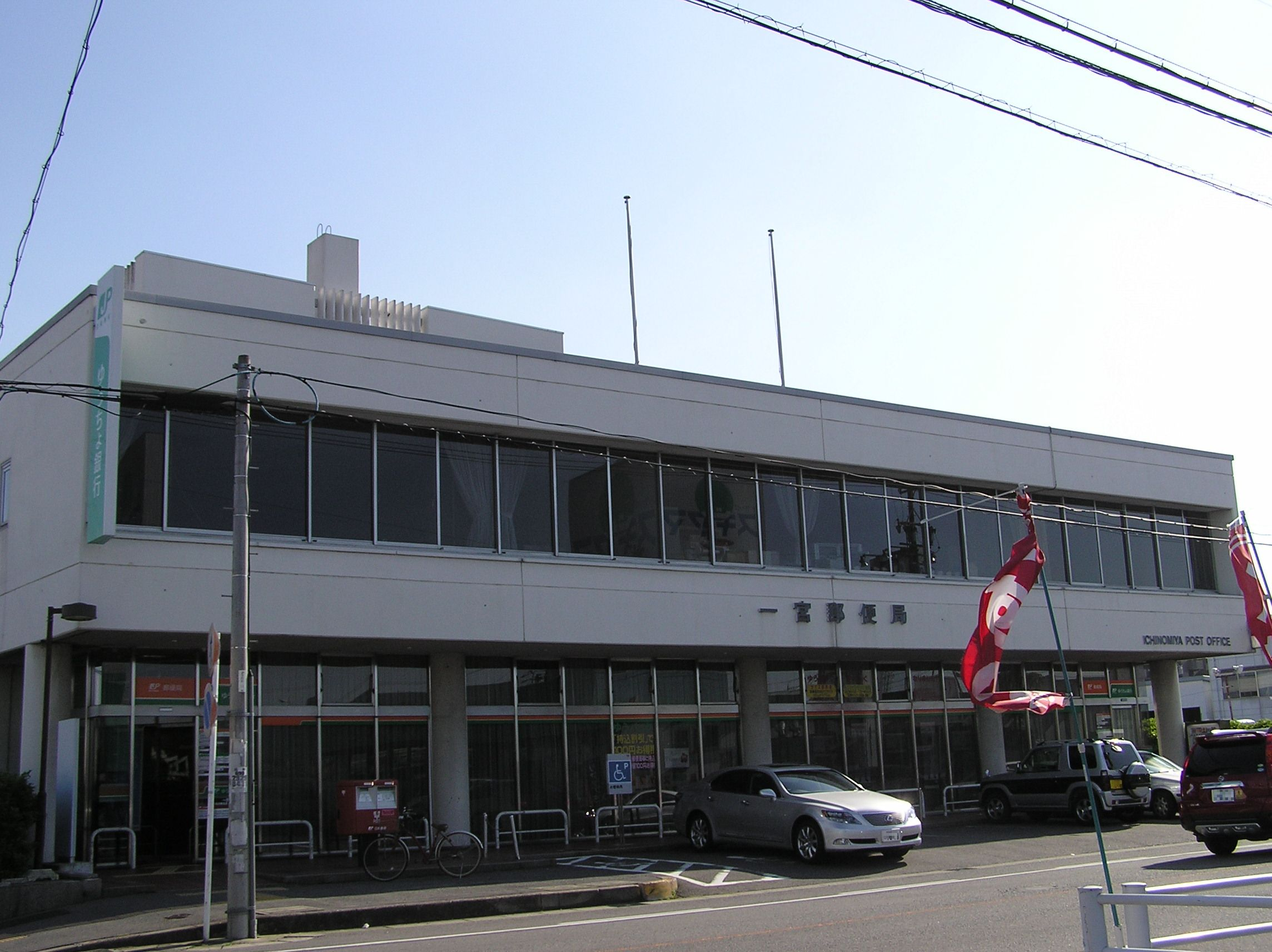
Ichinomiya Post Office

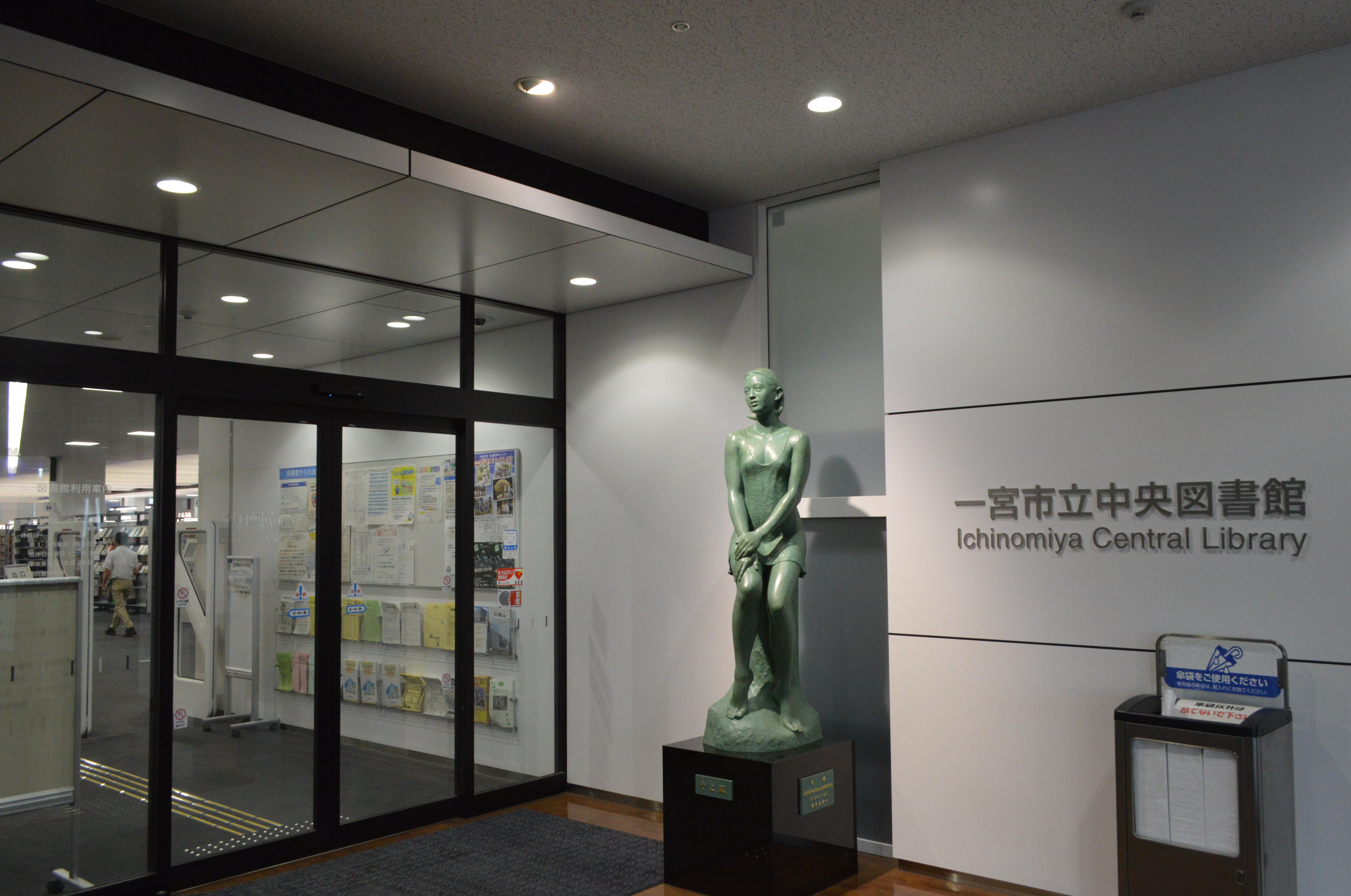
Ichinomiya City Library

== External relations ==
=== Twin towns – Sister cities ===
==== International ====
Friendship cities

- Treviso (Veneto, Italy)
  - since January 30, 2013

==== National ====
Disaster Alliance city

- Takaoka (Toyama Prefecture, Chūbu region)
  - since October 31, 2007
- Seki (Gifu Prefecture, Chūbu region)
  - since 2011

== Economy ==
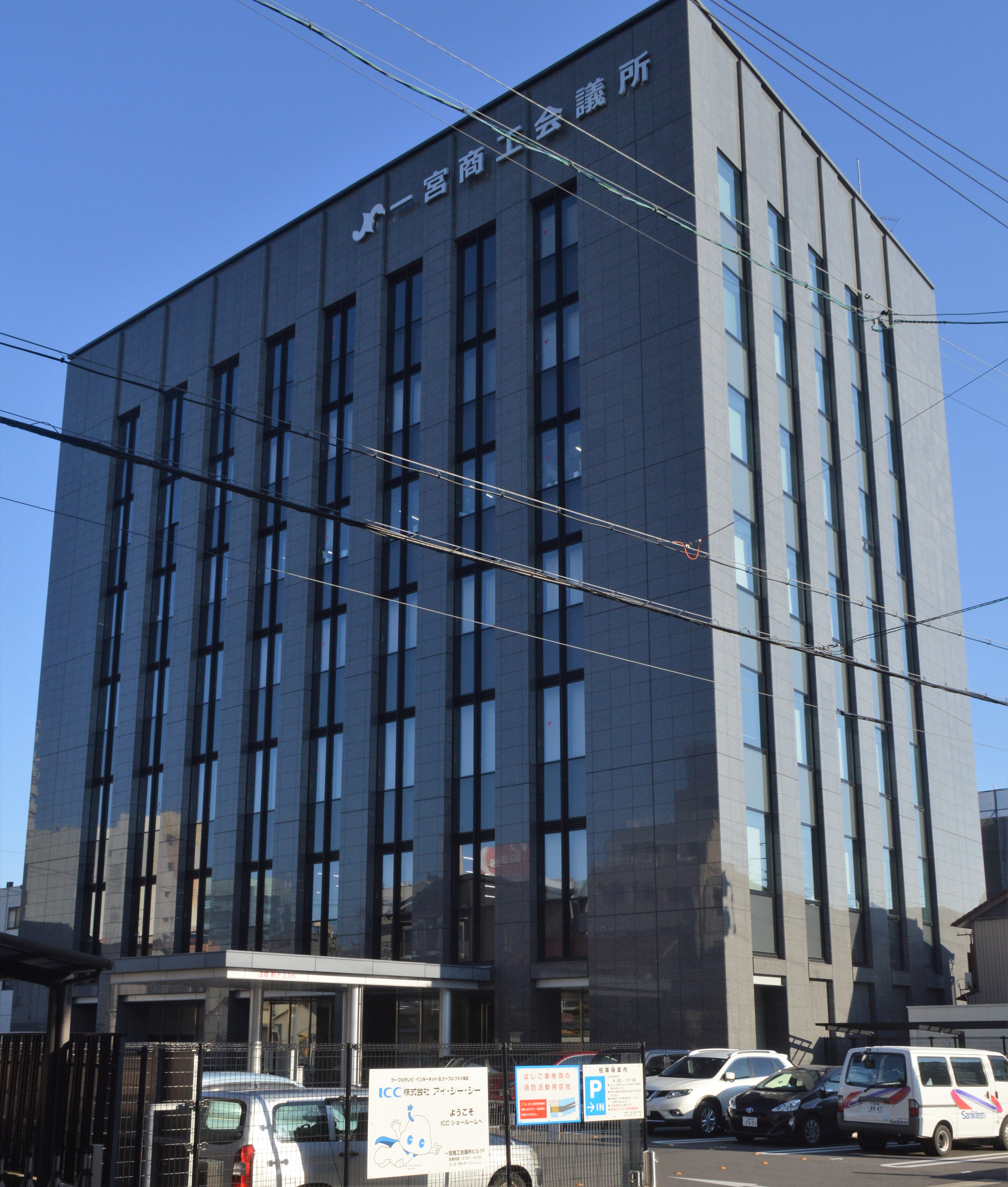
Ichinomiya Chamber of Commerce & Industry

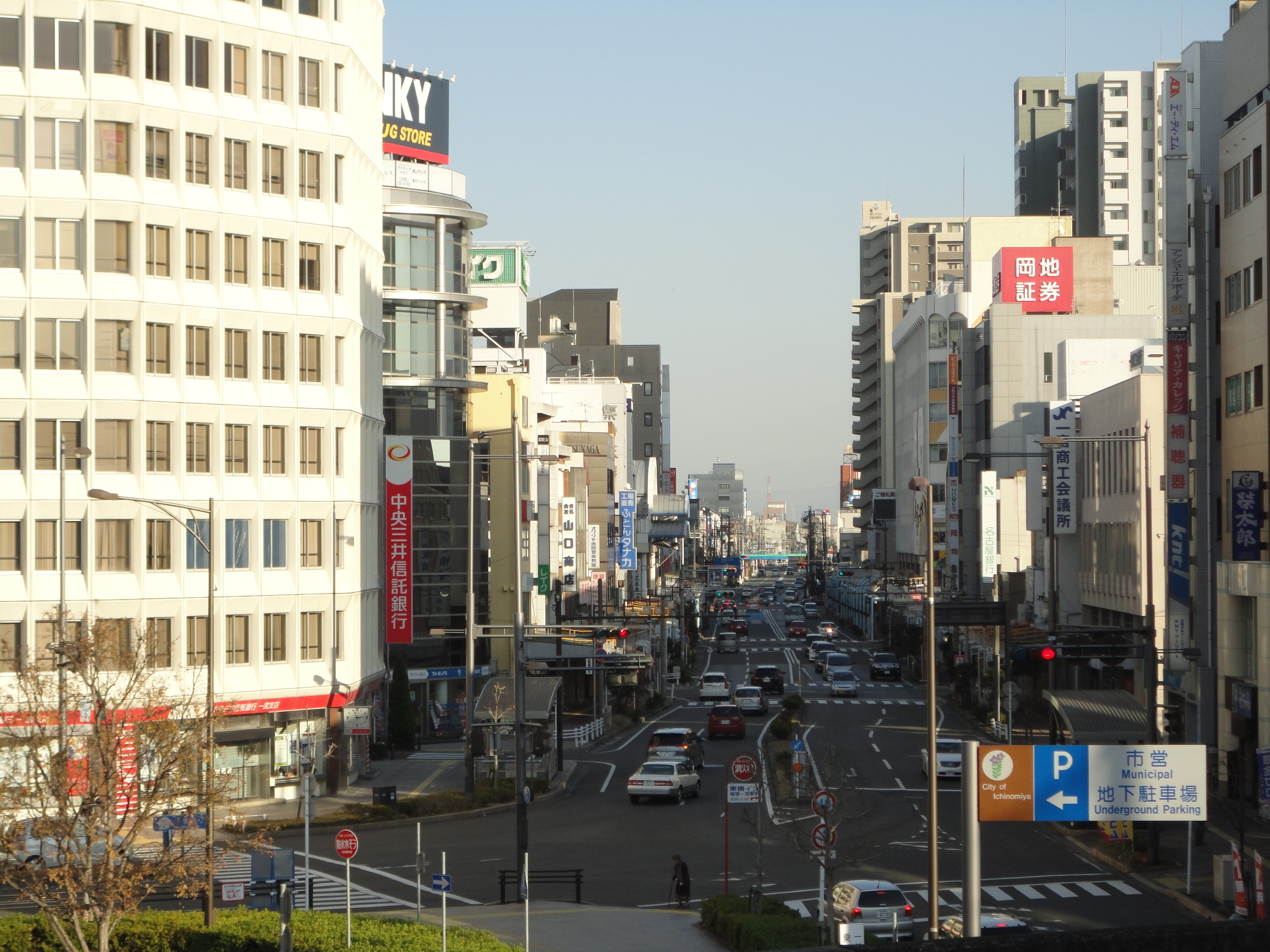
Downtown of Ichinomiya

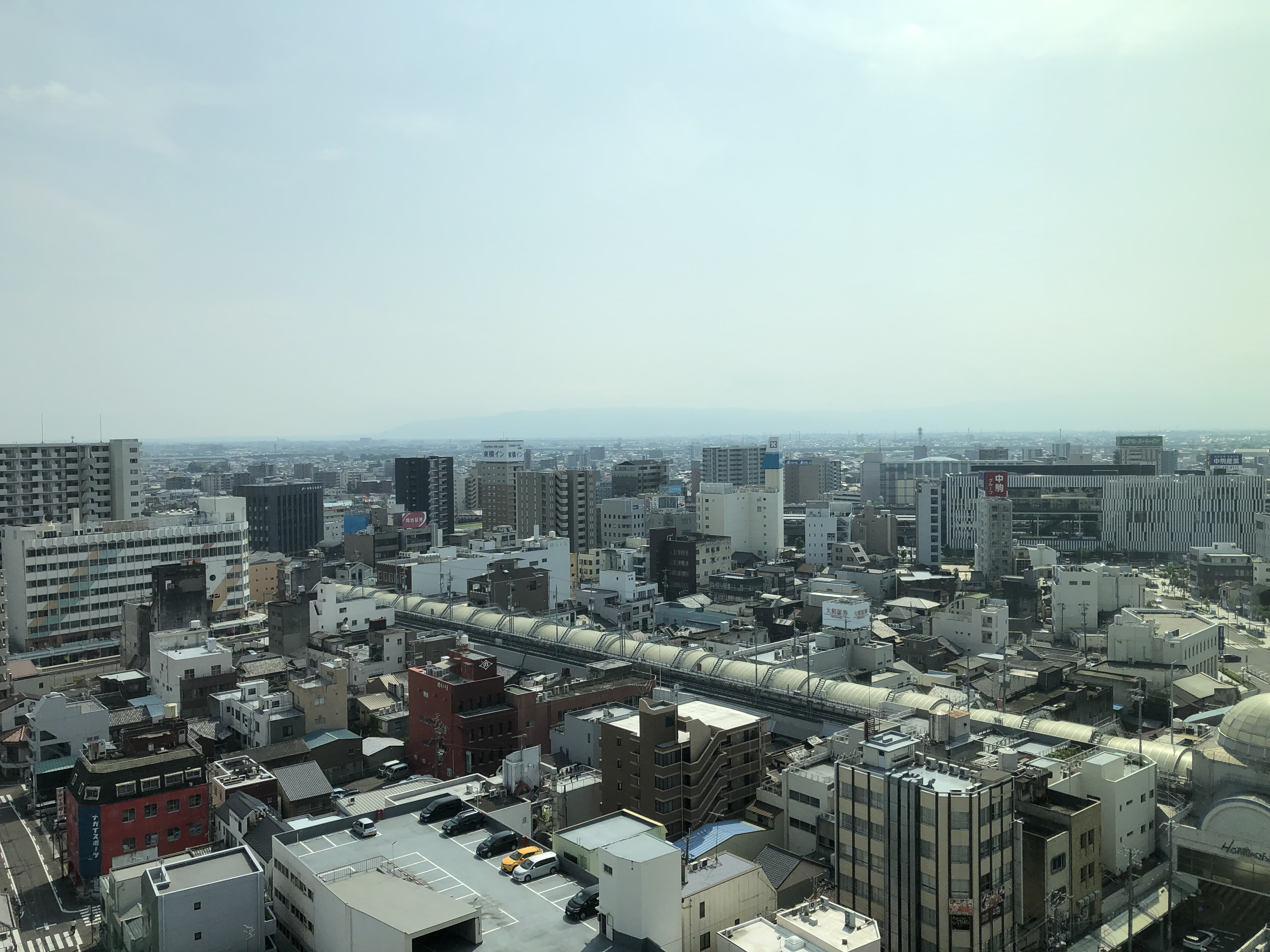
Ichinomiya CBD

=== Primary sector of the economy ===
Traditionally noted for textiles, Ichinomiya is now a regional commercial center with a mixed economy of manufacturing and agriculture.

==== Agriculture ====
- Allium fistulosum
- Dry Daikon
- Rice

==== Animal husbandry ====
- Poultry farming

=== Secondary sector of the economy ===
==== Manufacturing ====
The Eisaku Noro Company, which produces colorful handcrafting and machine yarns for clothing, is also based here.

=== Tertiary sector of the economy ===
==== Commerce ====
Kanesue has its headquarters in Ichinomiya. It moved to its current headquarters in July 1976.

Shopping center

- APiTA Ichinomiya (TelassWalk Ichinomiya)
- Æon mall Kisogawa
- Kanesue
- Meitetsu Department Store Ichinomiya
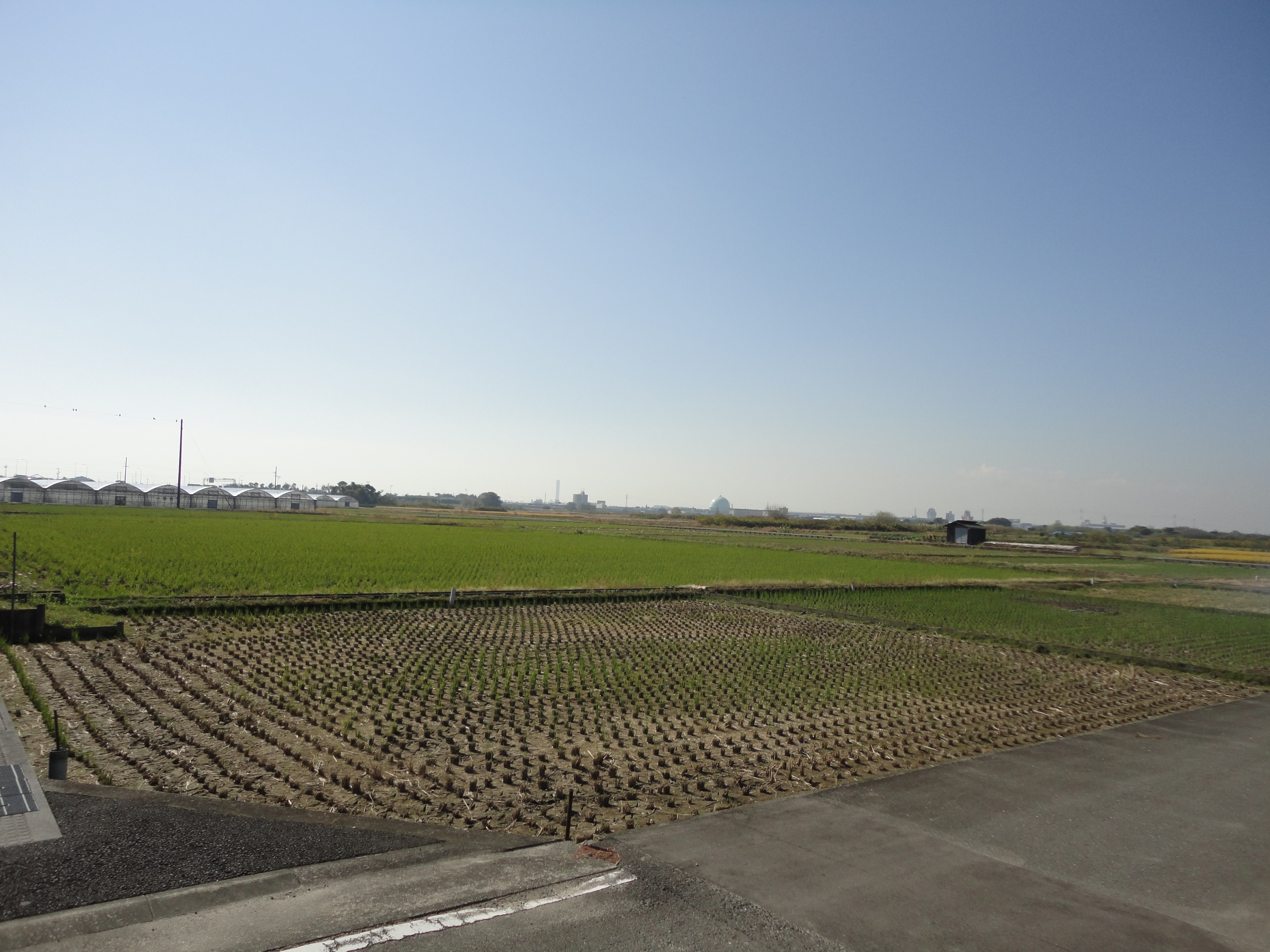
Chiaki Paddy field

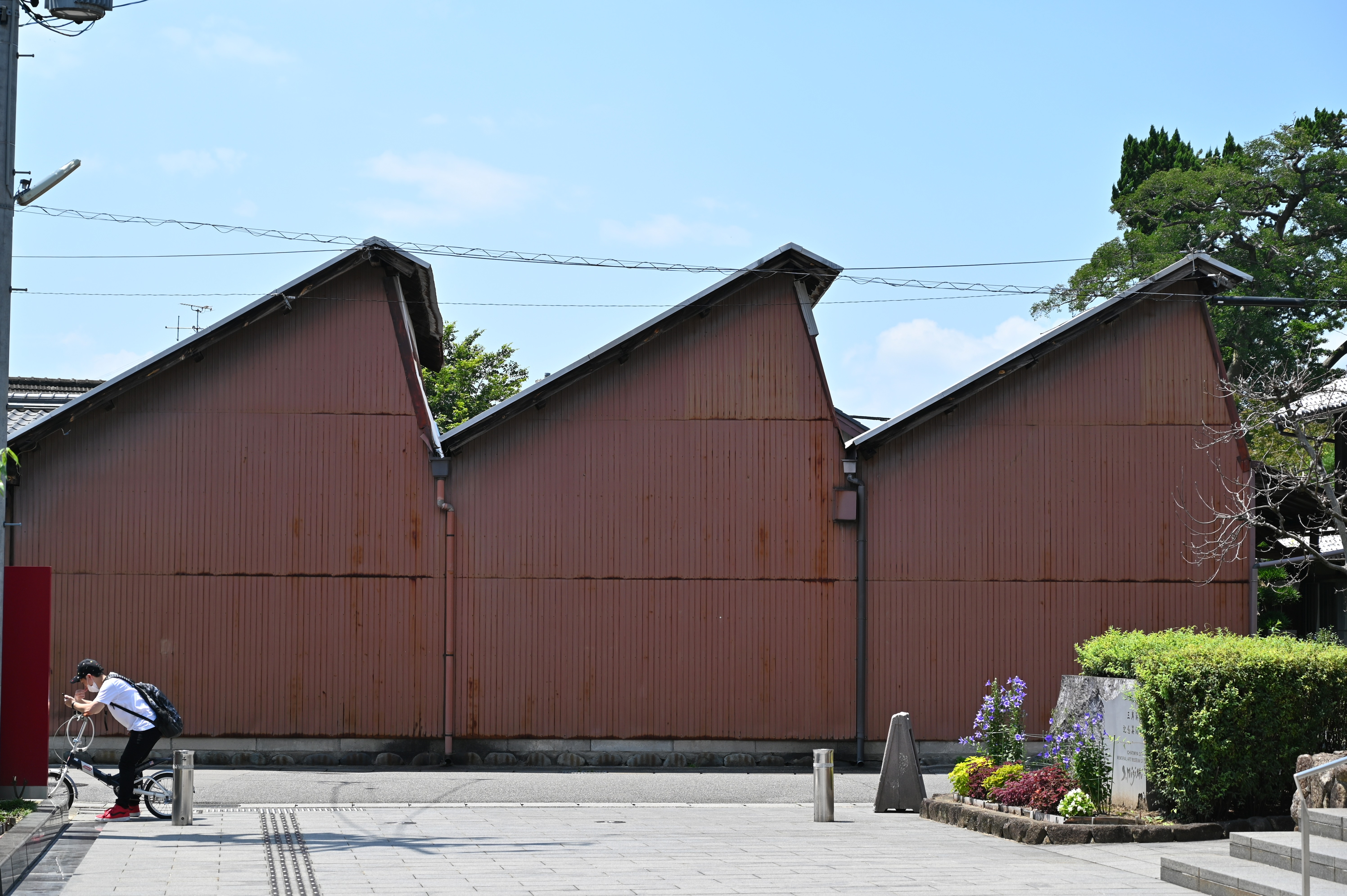
Bisyu Woven fabric factory

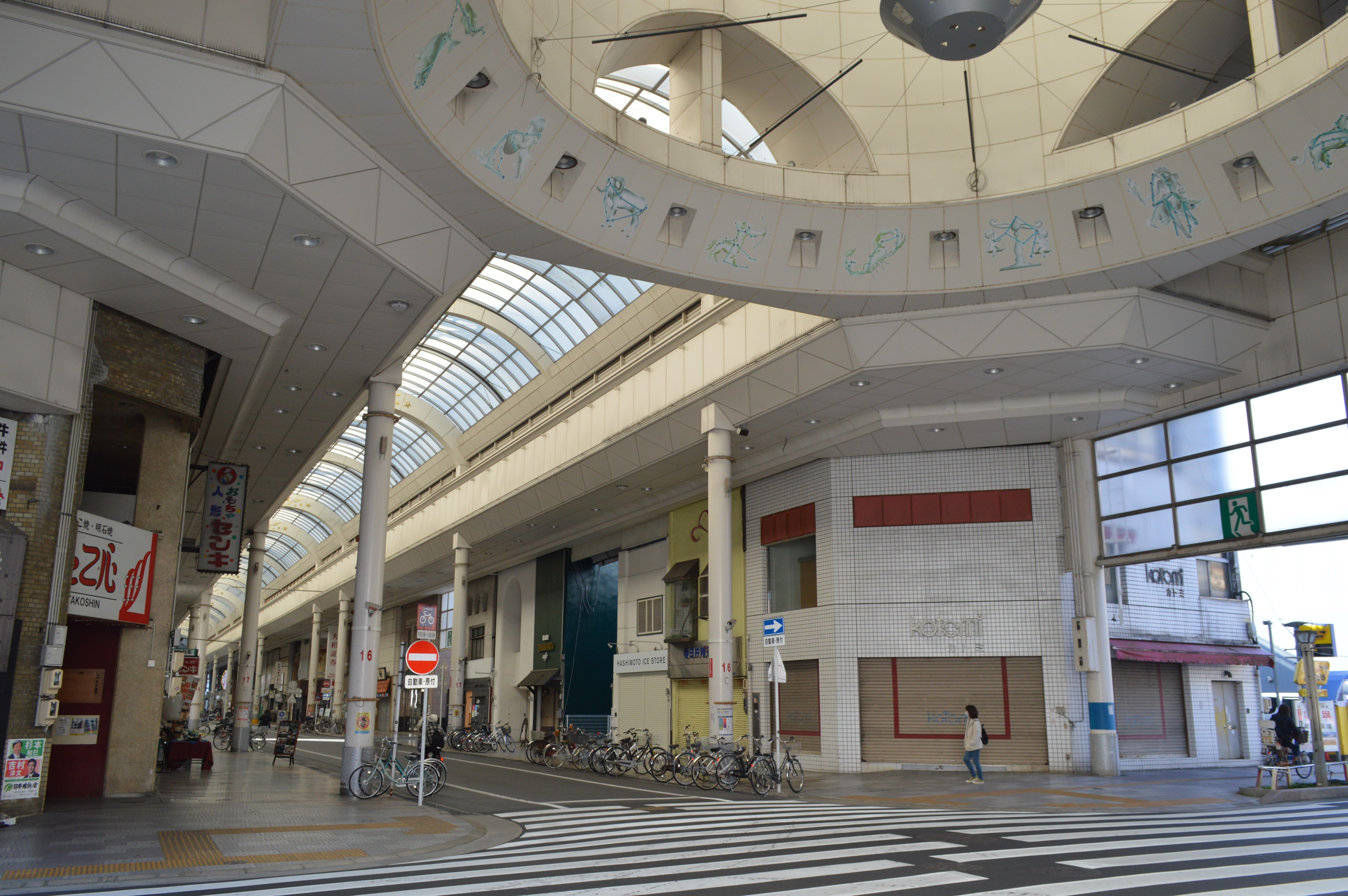
Shopping streets

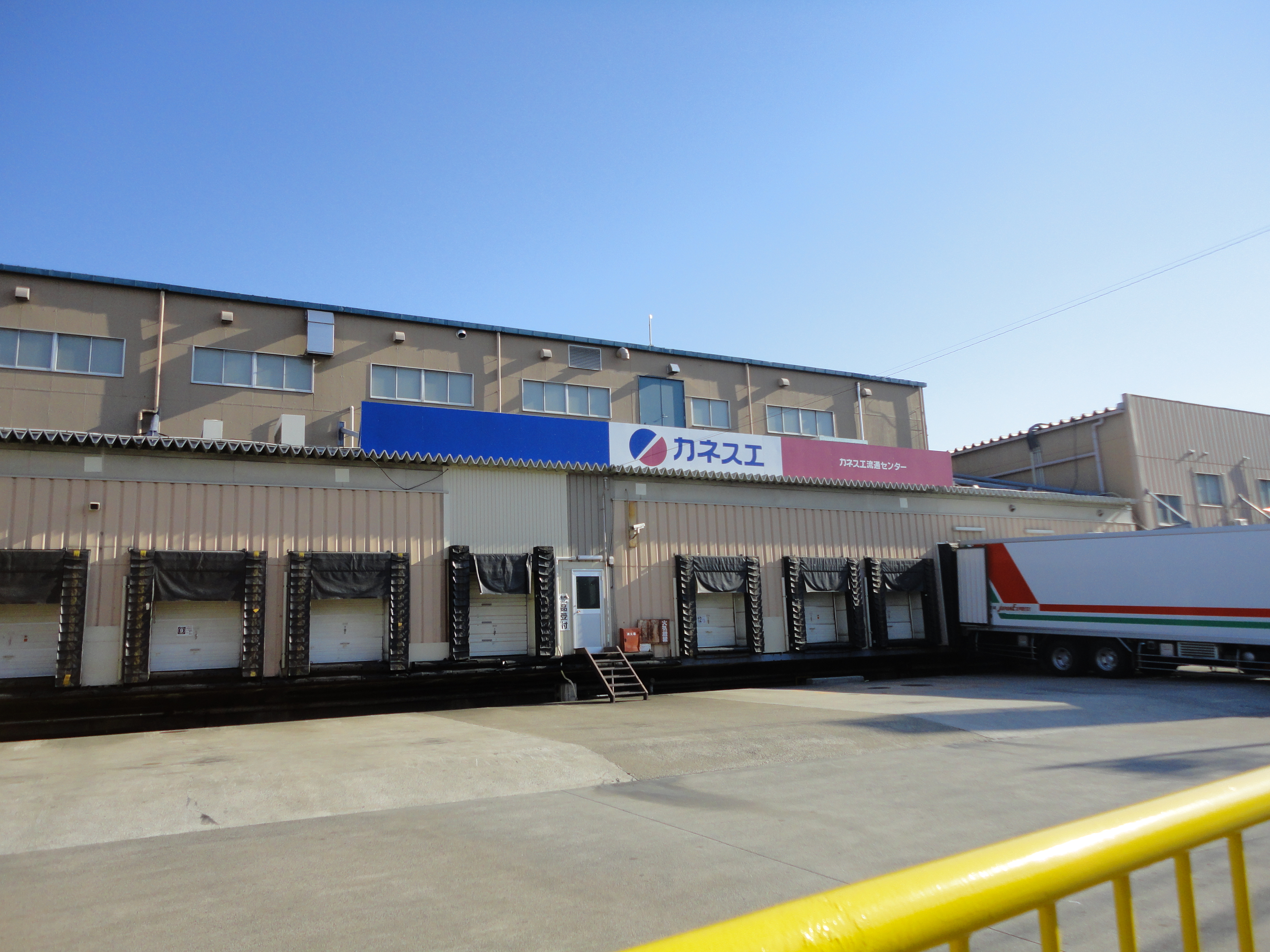
Kanesue

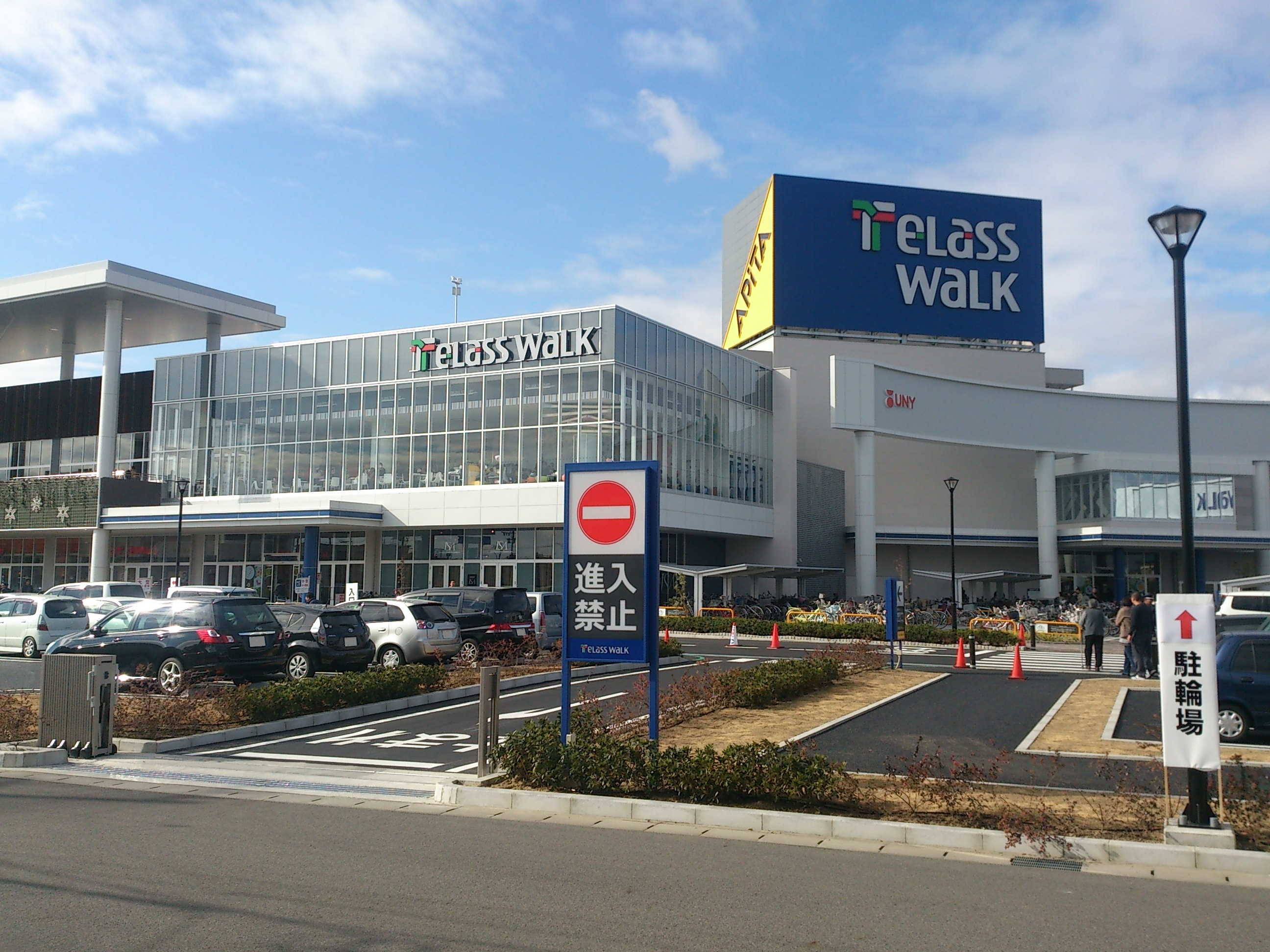
TelassWalk Ichinomiya

=== Companies headquartered in Ichinomiya ===
- Aichi small-elevator manufacturing corporation
- Ichibanya
- Japan Ecosystem
- Kanesue
- Konami Amusement
- SOTOH

== Education ==
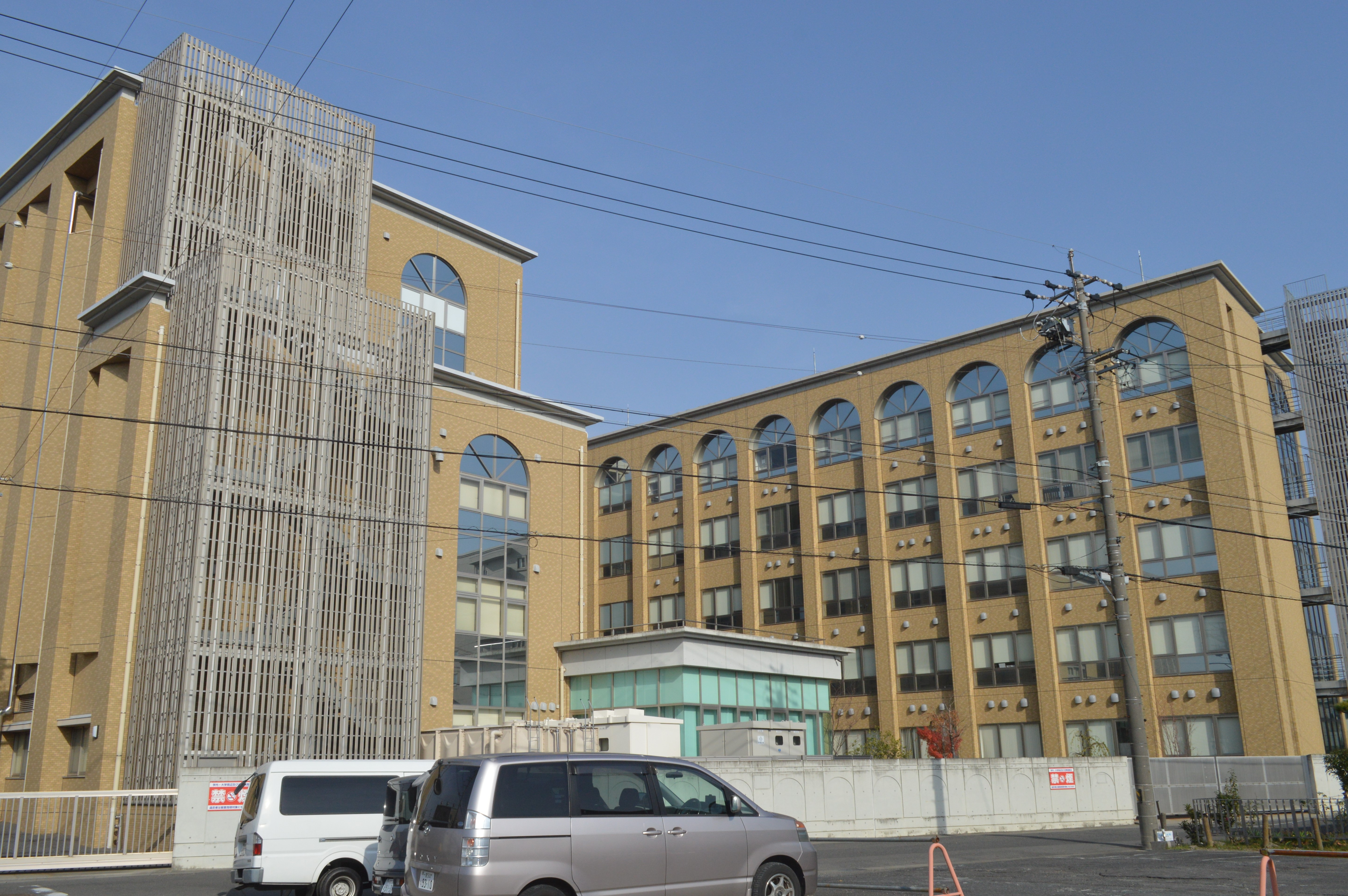
Shubun University

=== University ===
- Shubun University

=== College ===
- Aichi Kiwami College of Nursing
- Ichinomiya Kenshin College

=== Primary and secondary education ===
- Ichinomiya has 42 public elementary schools and 19 public middle schools operated by the city government, and 10 public high schools operated by the Aichi Prefectural Board of Education. The city also has one private middle school and two private high schools. The prefecture also operates two special education schools for the handicapped.

== Transportation ==
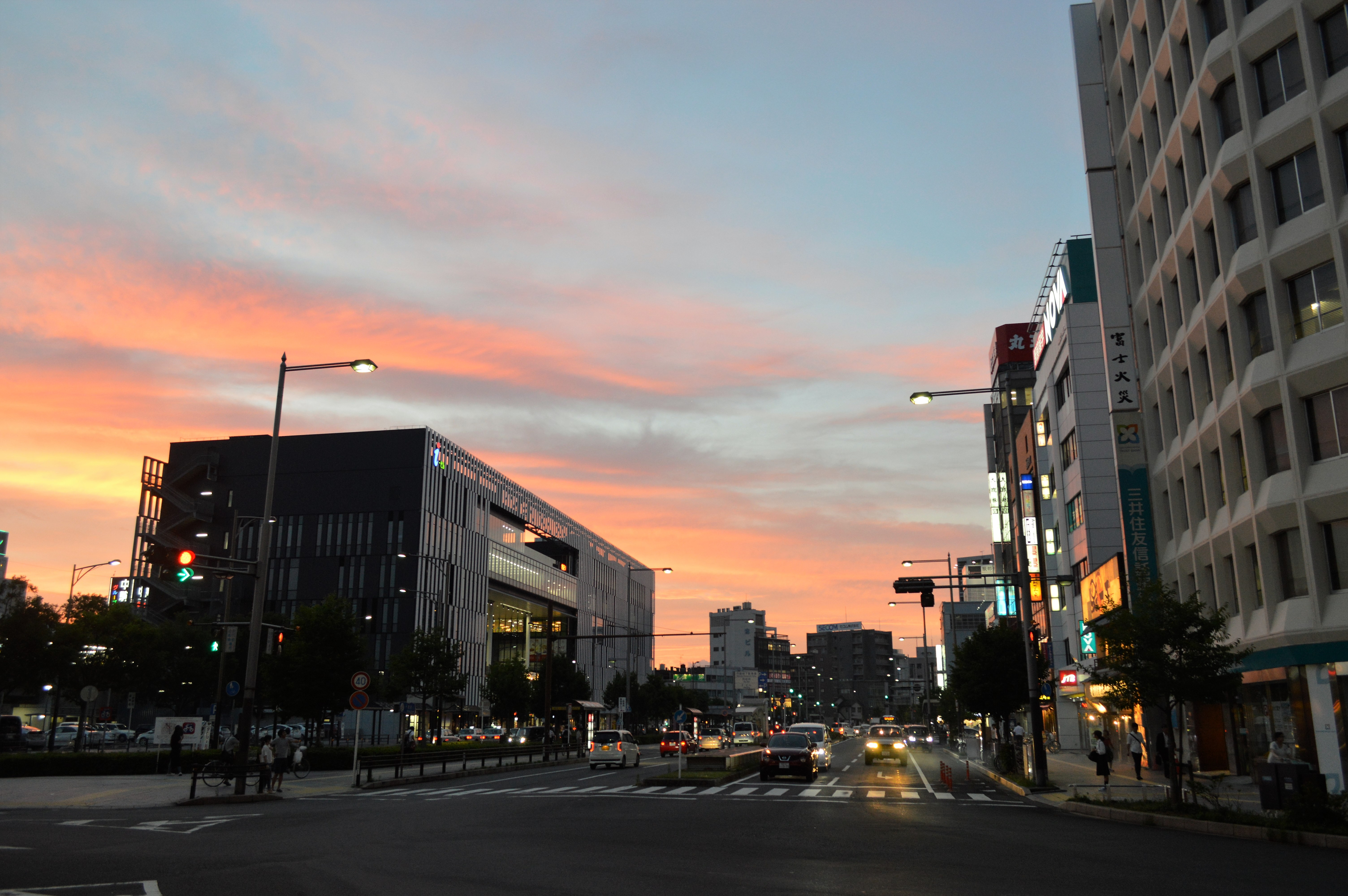
Around Owari-Ichinomiya Station

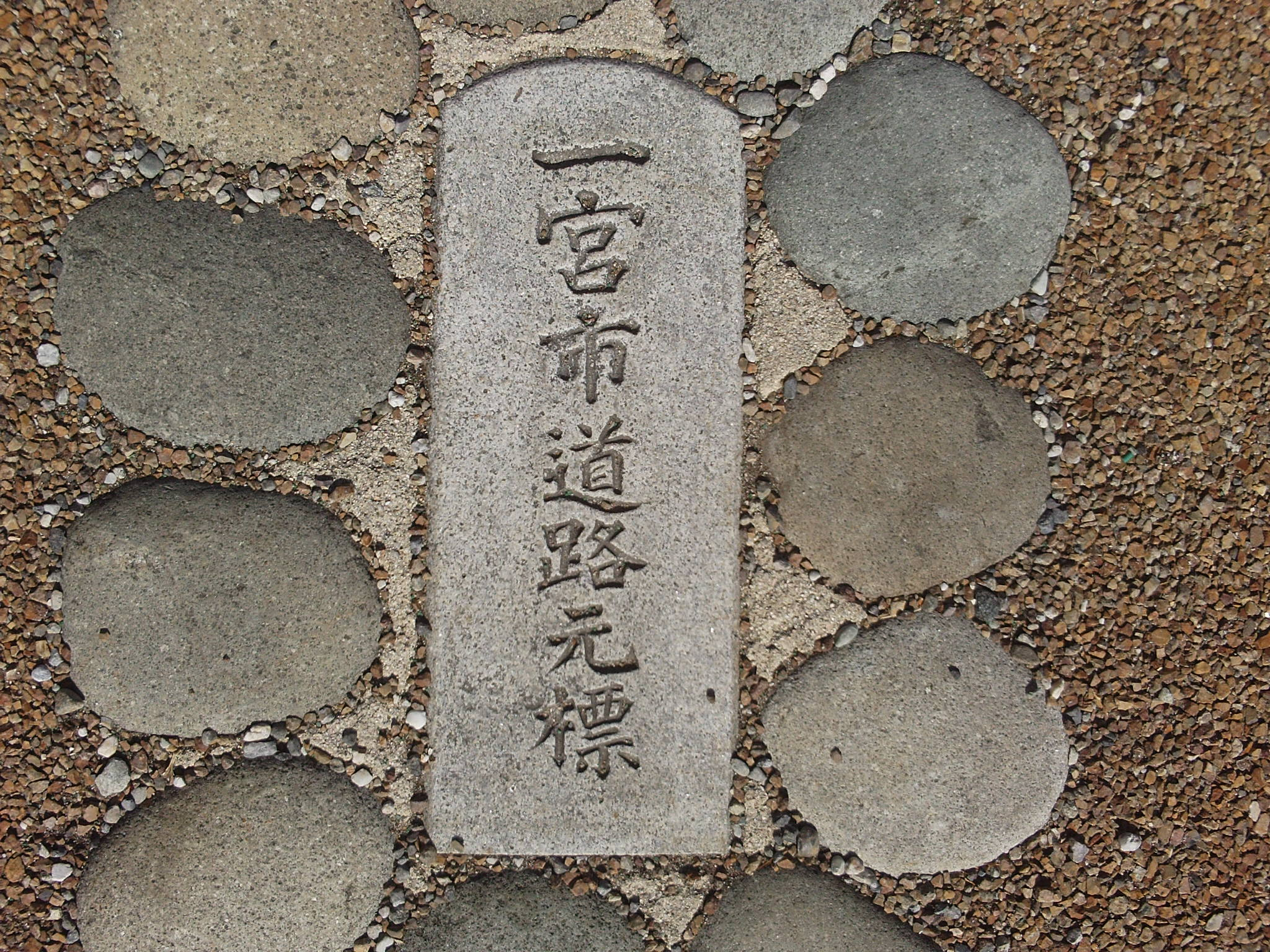
The Kilometre Zero of Ichinomiya

=== Railways ===
==== Conventional lines ====
Central Japan Railway Company

- Tōkaidō Line: – Owari-Ichinomiya – Kisogawa –

Meitetsu

- Nagoya Main Line: Shima-Ujinaga – Myōkōji – Meitetsu-Ichinomiya – Imaise – Iwato – Shin-Kisogawa – Kuroda – Kisogawazutsumi
- Bisai Line: Tamano – Hagiwara – Futago – Kariyasuka – Kannonji – Meitetsu-Ichinomiya – Nishi-Ichinomiya – Kaimei – Okuchō – Tamanoi

=== Roads ===
==== Expressways ====
- Meishin Expressway
  - - Owari Ichinomiya PA – Ichinomiya IC – Ichinomita JCT –
- Tōkai-Hokuriku Expressway
  - Ichinomiya JCT – Ichinomiya-Nishi IC – Hizai IC – Ichinomiya-Kisogawa IC –
- Nagoya Expressway
  - Route 16 (Nagoya Expressway)

==== Japan National Route ====
- National Route 22
- National Route 155

=== Riverways ===
==== Water taxi ====
- Nishinakano tosen (Kiso River)
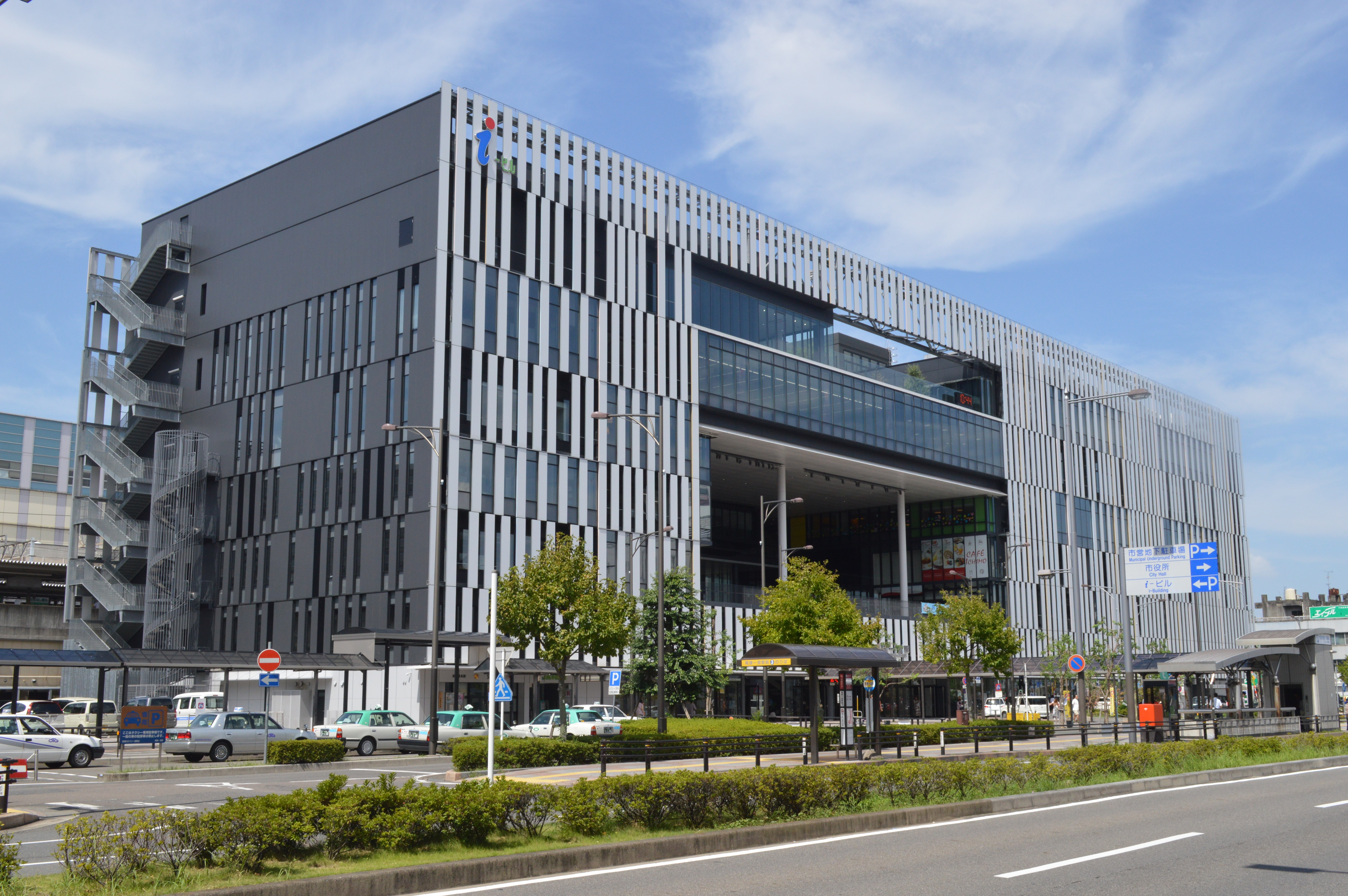
Owari-Ichinomiya

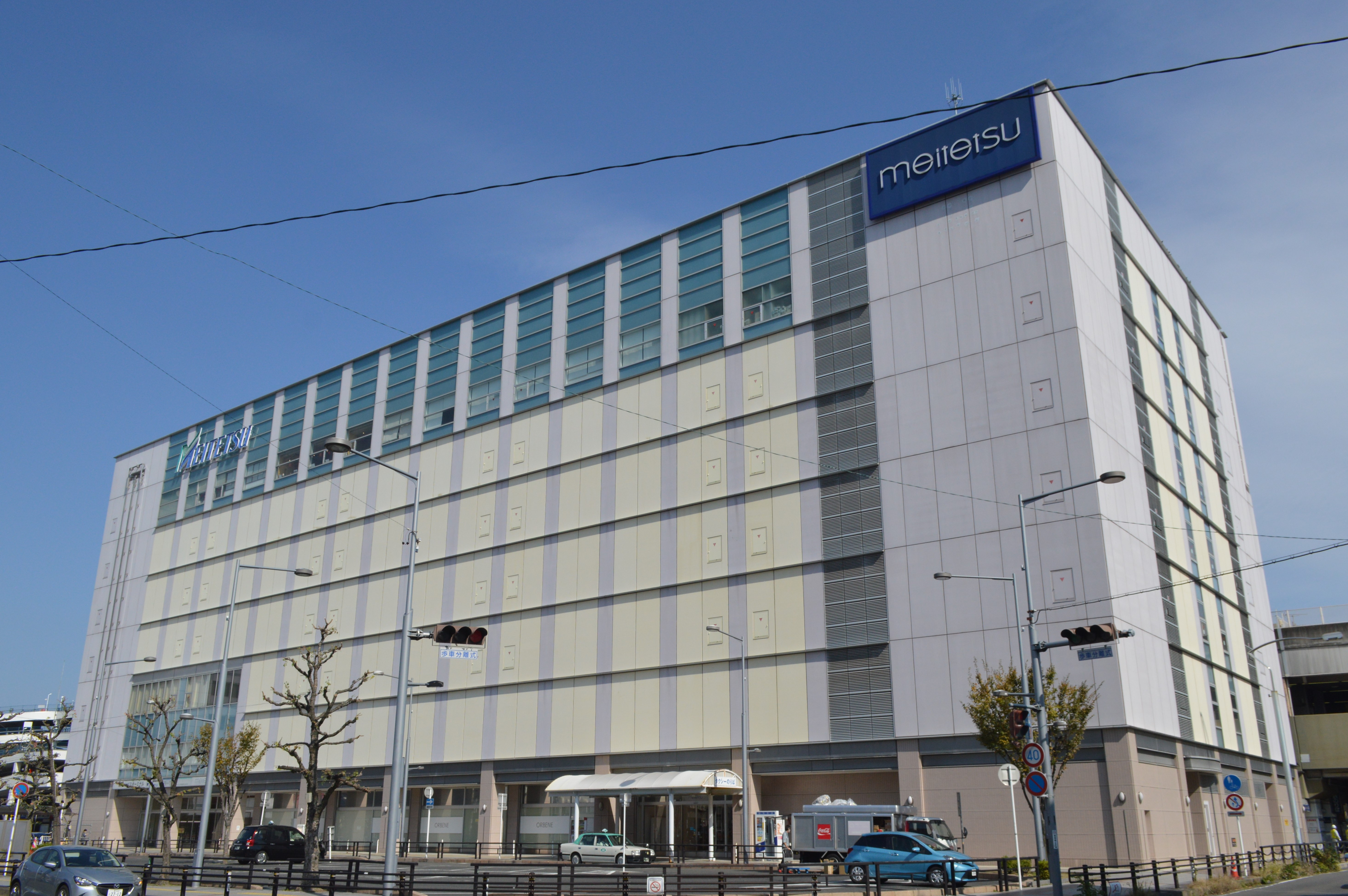
Meitetsu-Ichinomiya

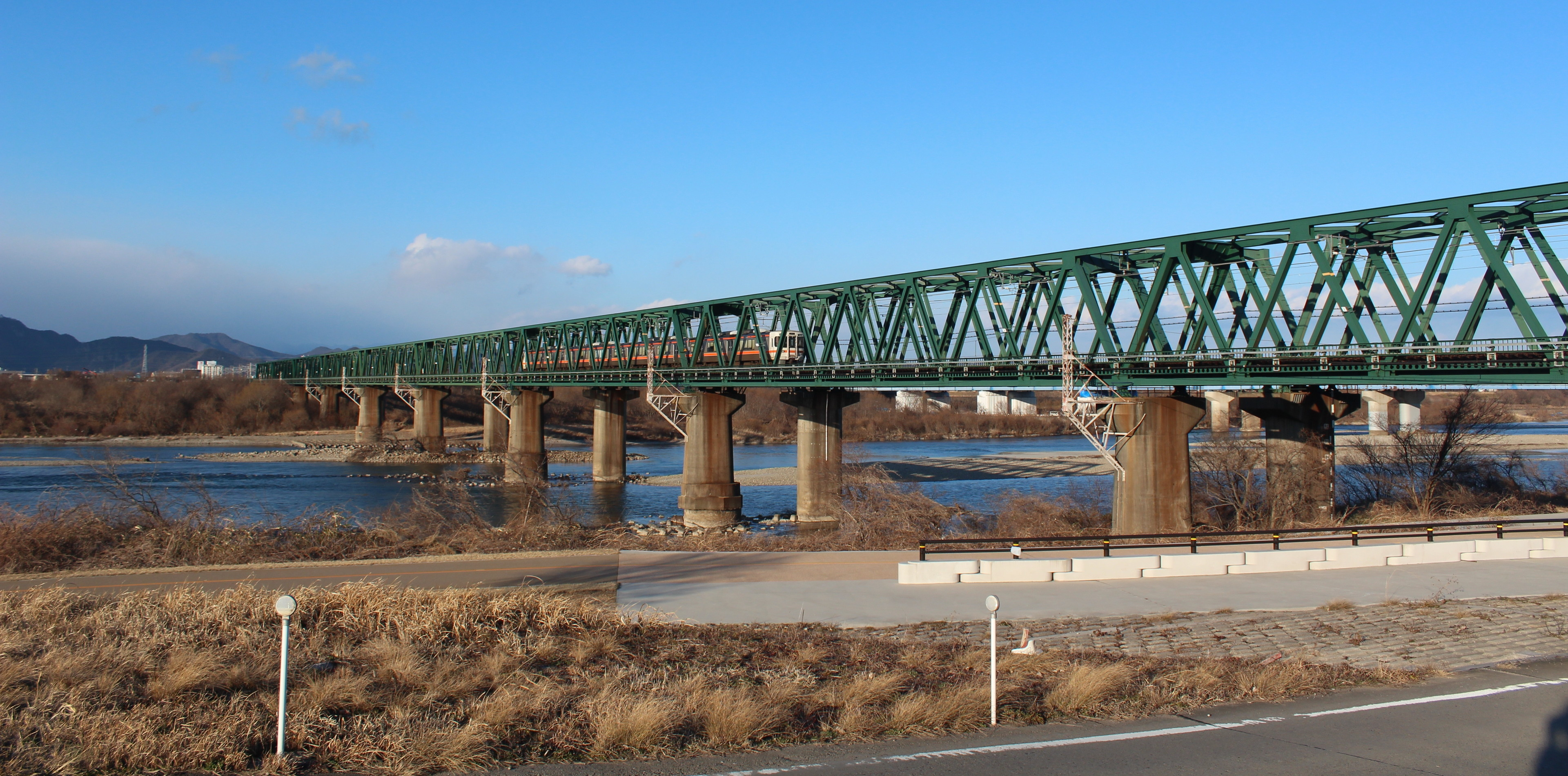
Kisogawa Bridge

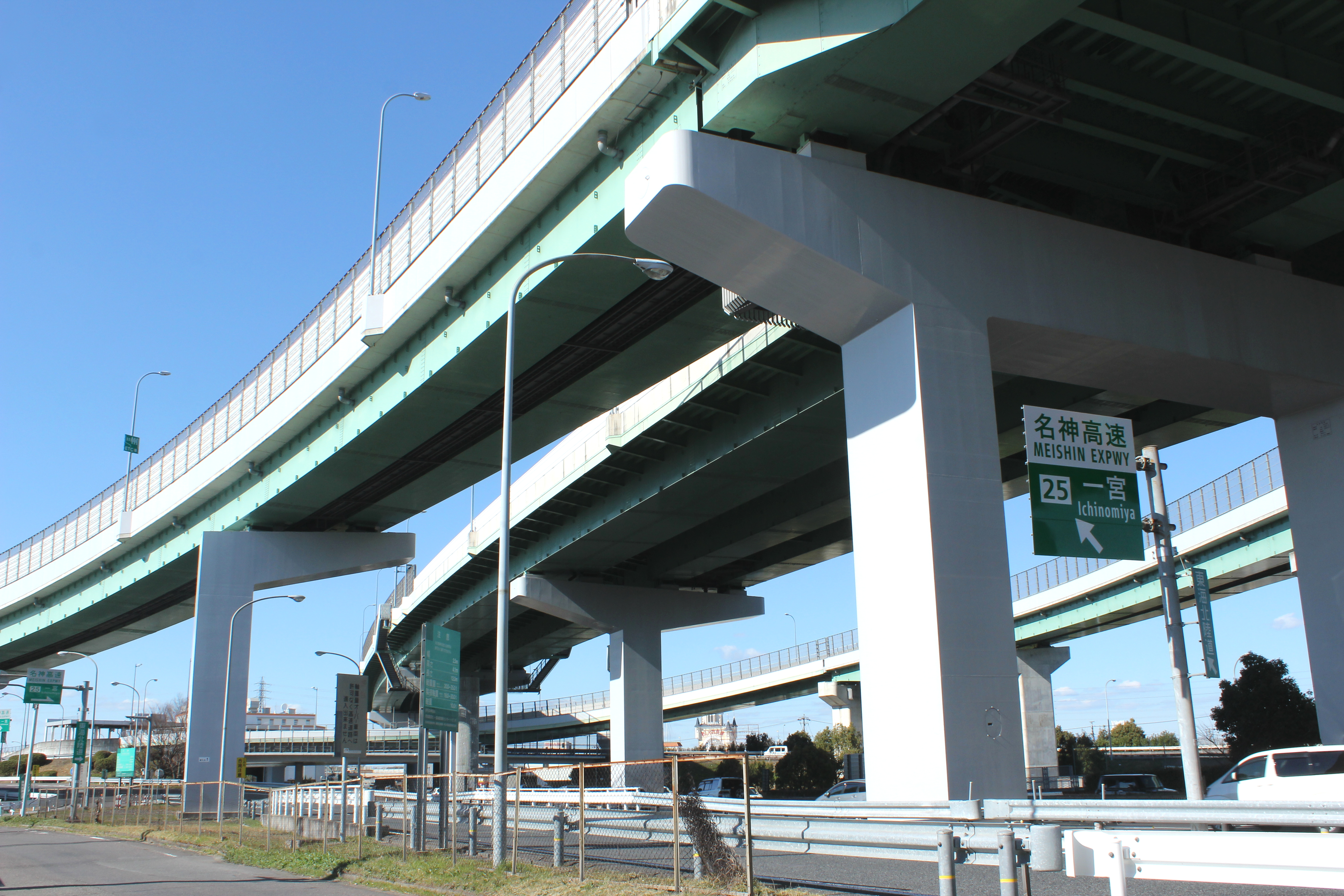
Ichinomiya IC

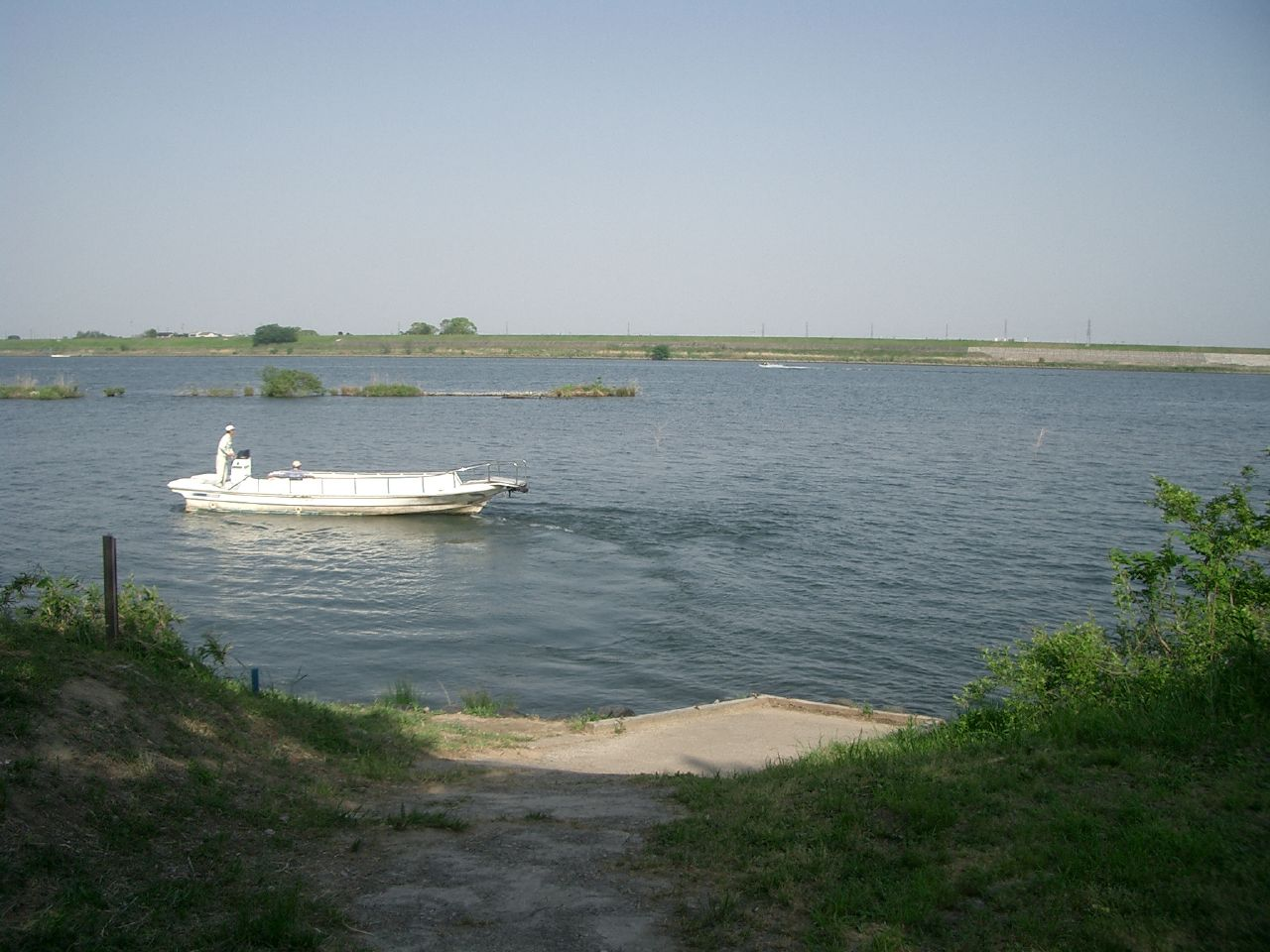
Nishinakano tosen

== Local attractions ==
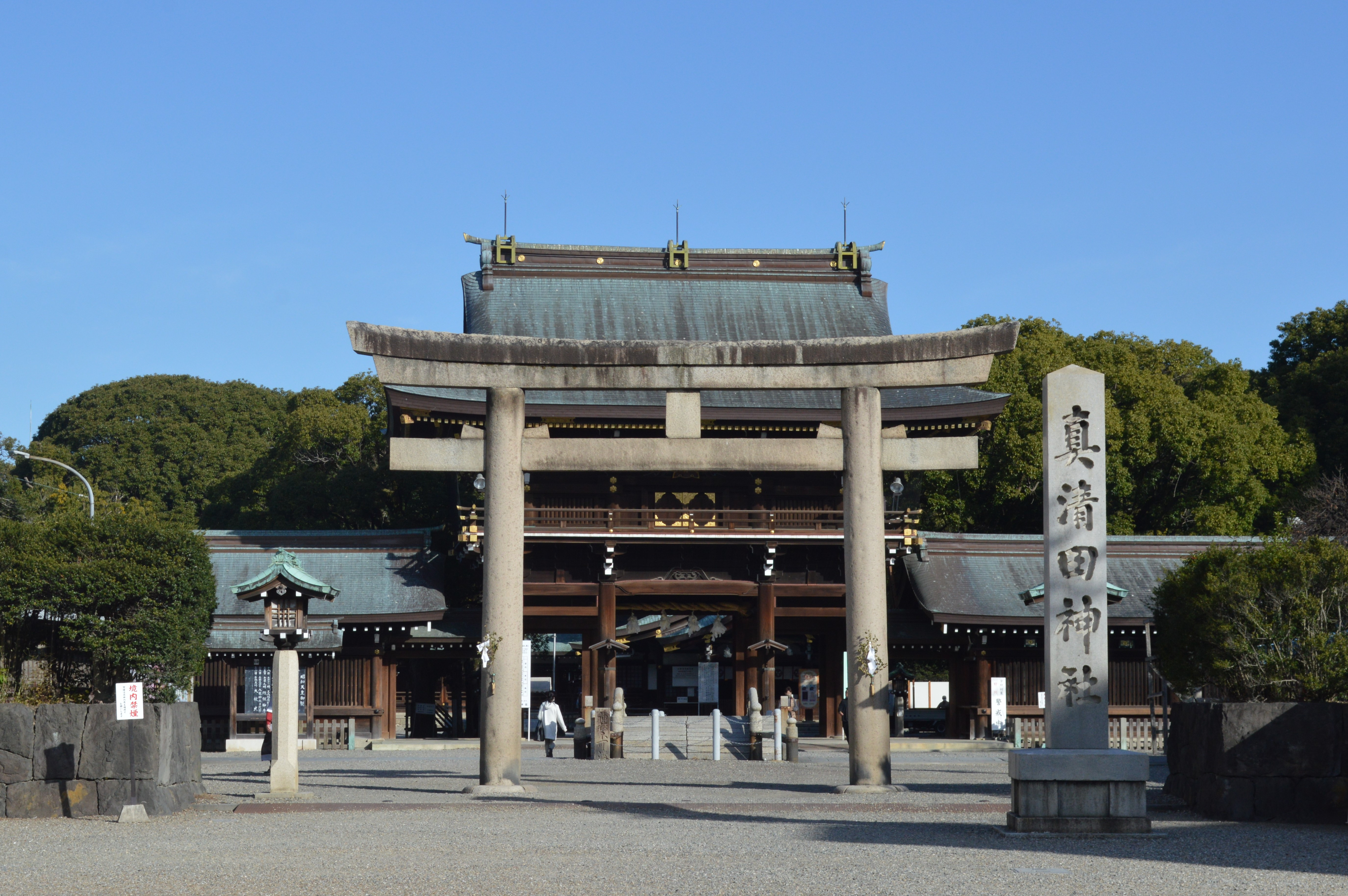
Masumida Shrine

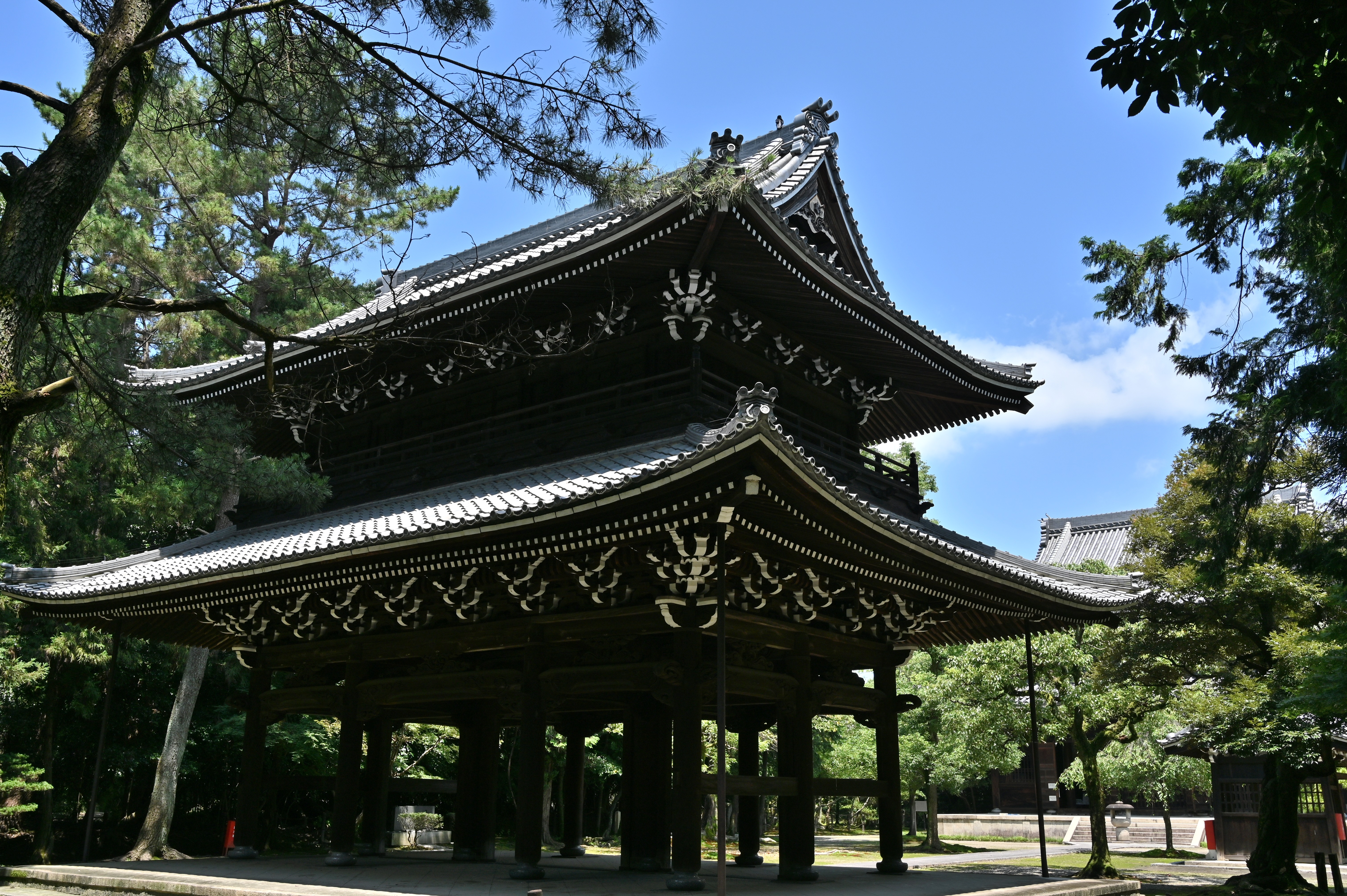
Myōkō-ji

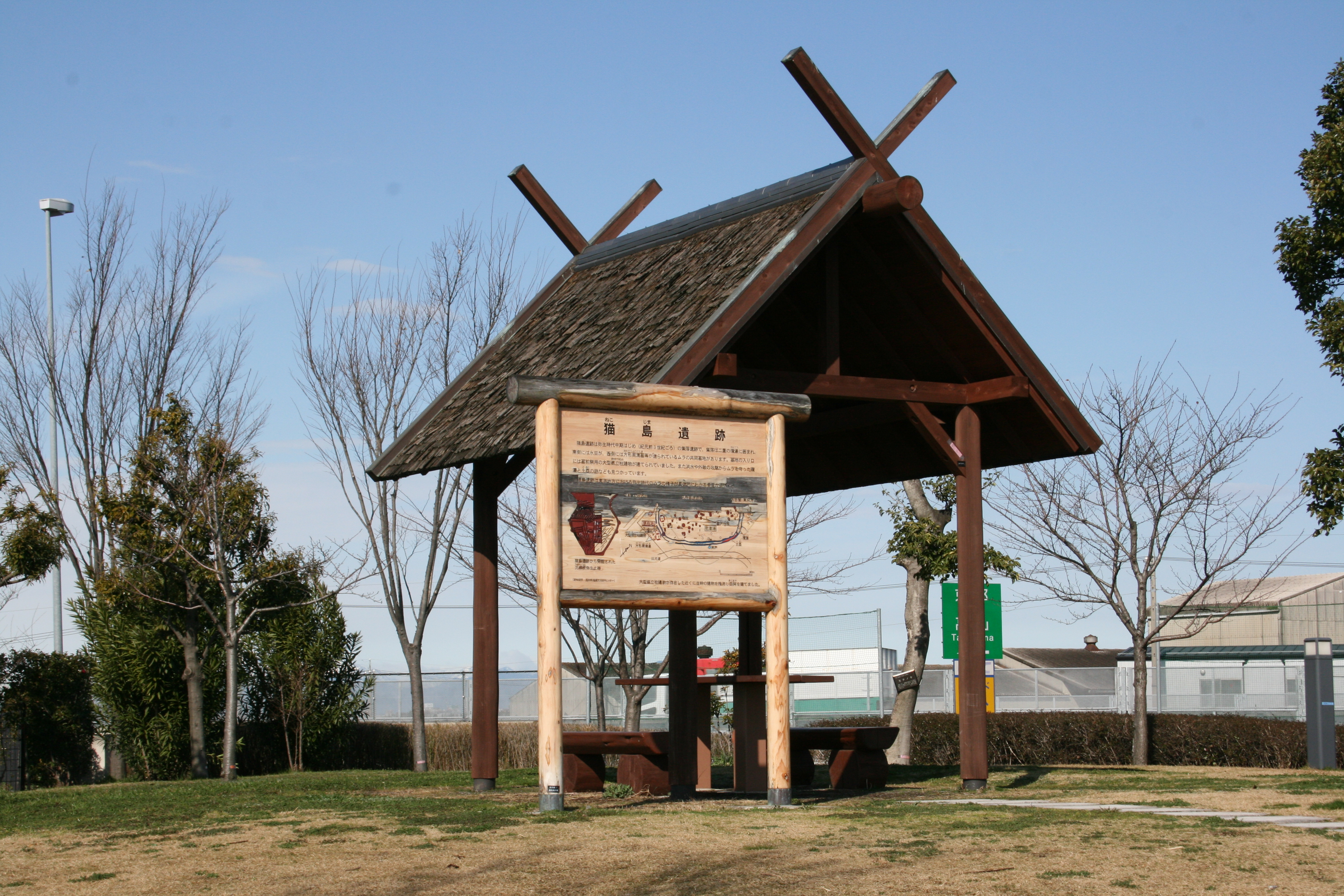
Nekojima Site

Castle

- Ichinomiya Castle
- Kuroda Castle
- Ōno Castle
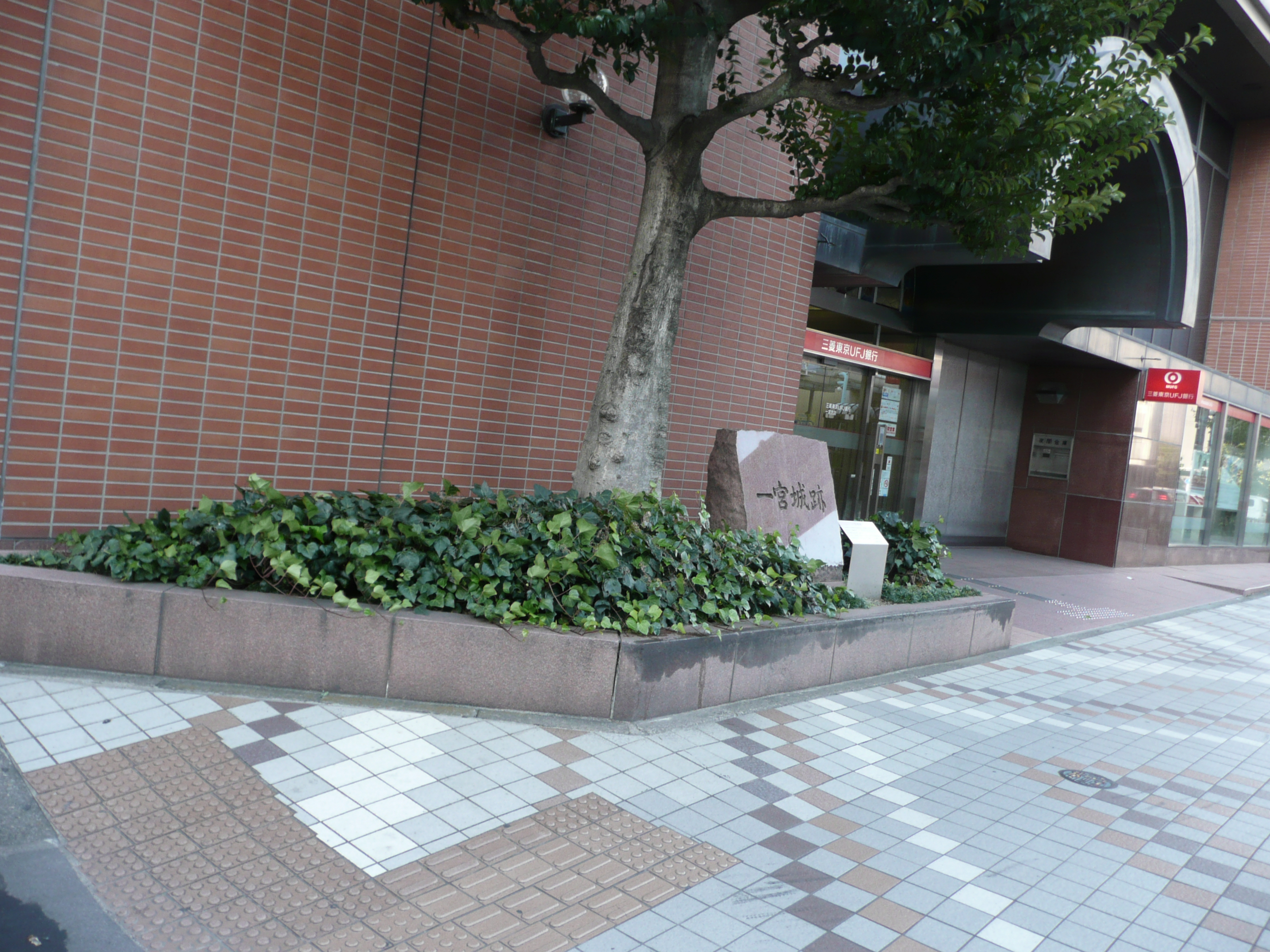
Ichinomiya Castle

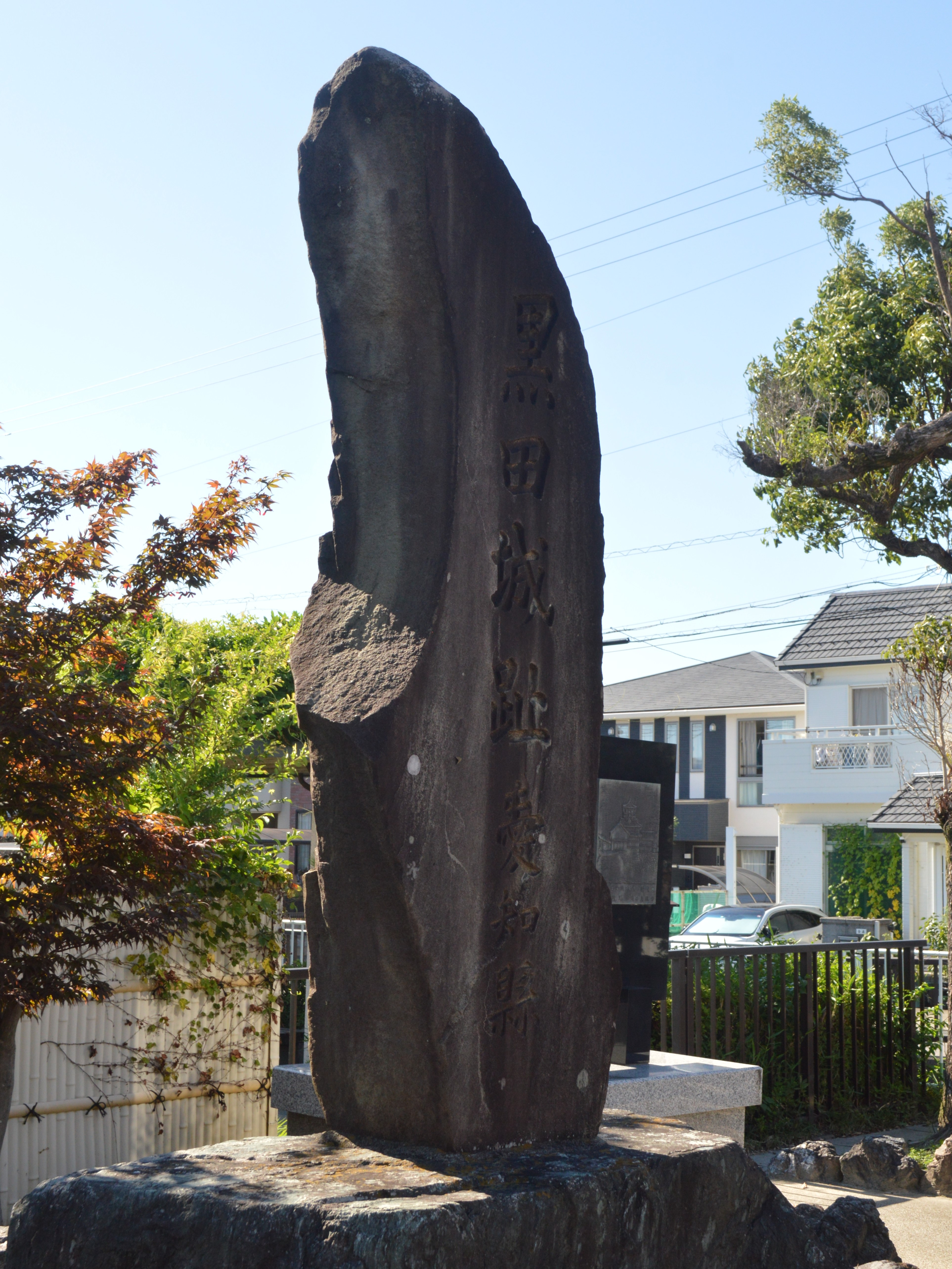
Kuroda Castle

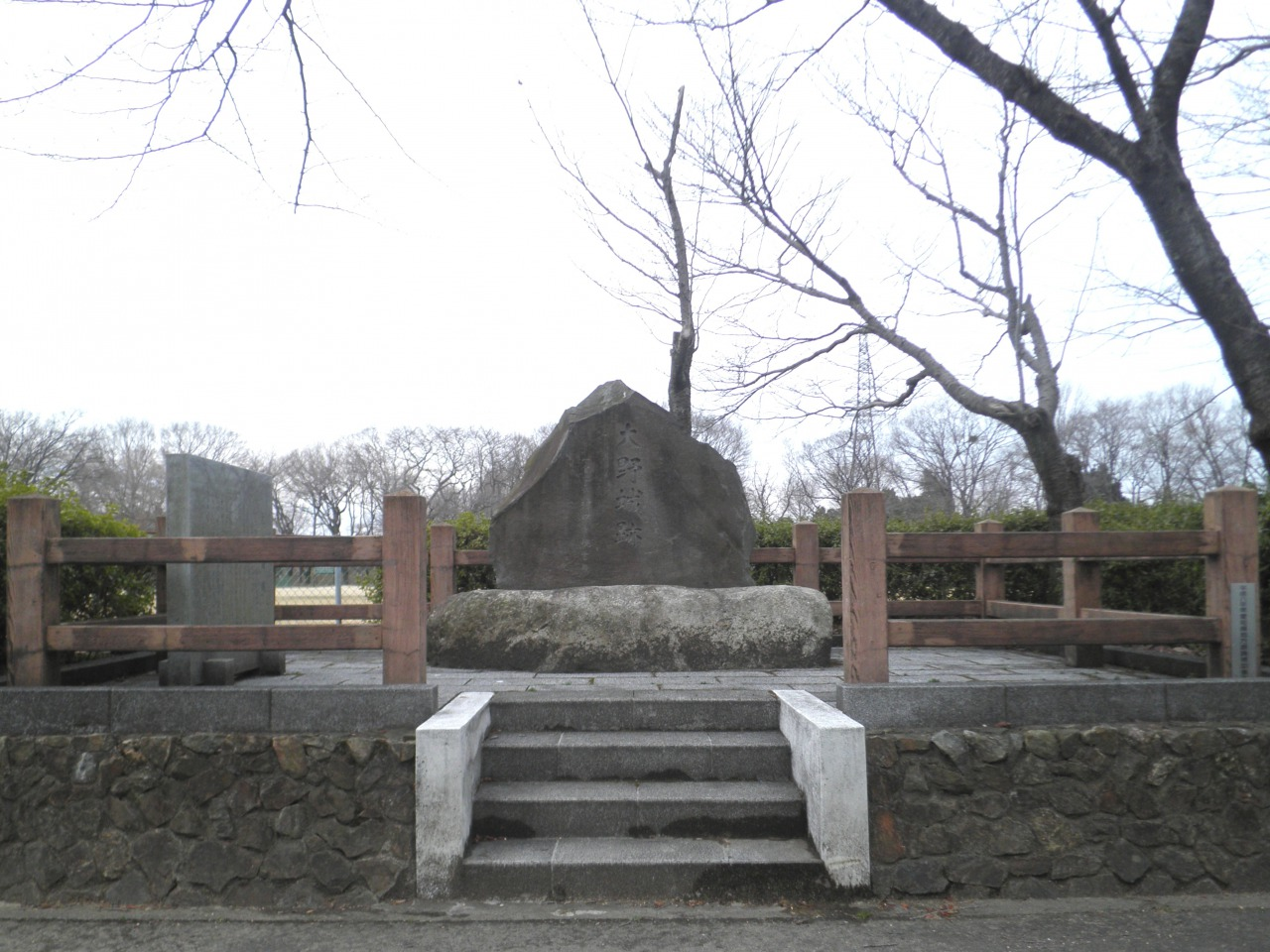
Ōno Castle

Buddhist temple

- Houren-ji
- Myōkō-ji
- Sebe Saihō-ji
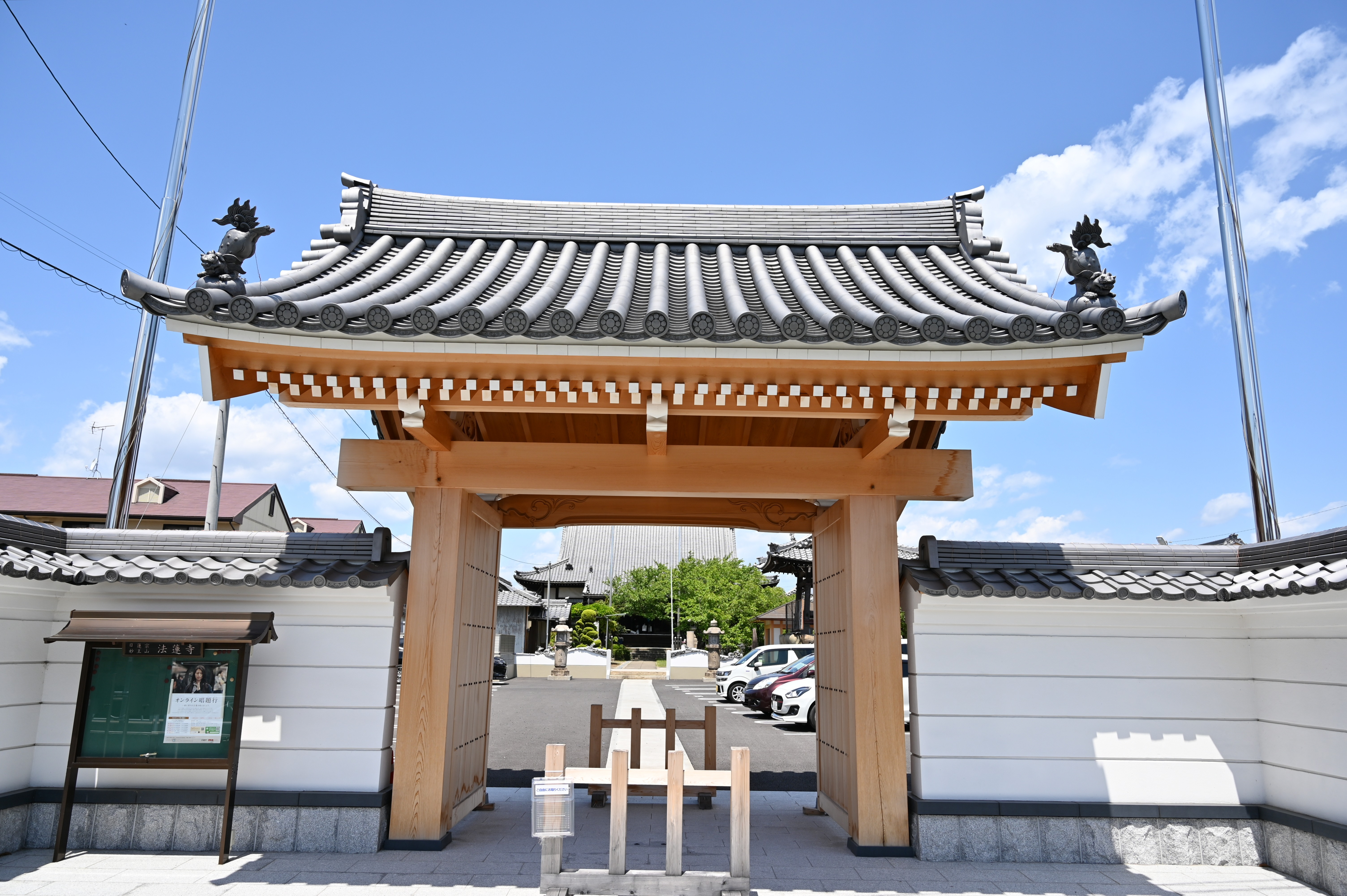
Houren-ji

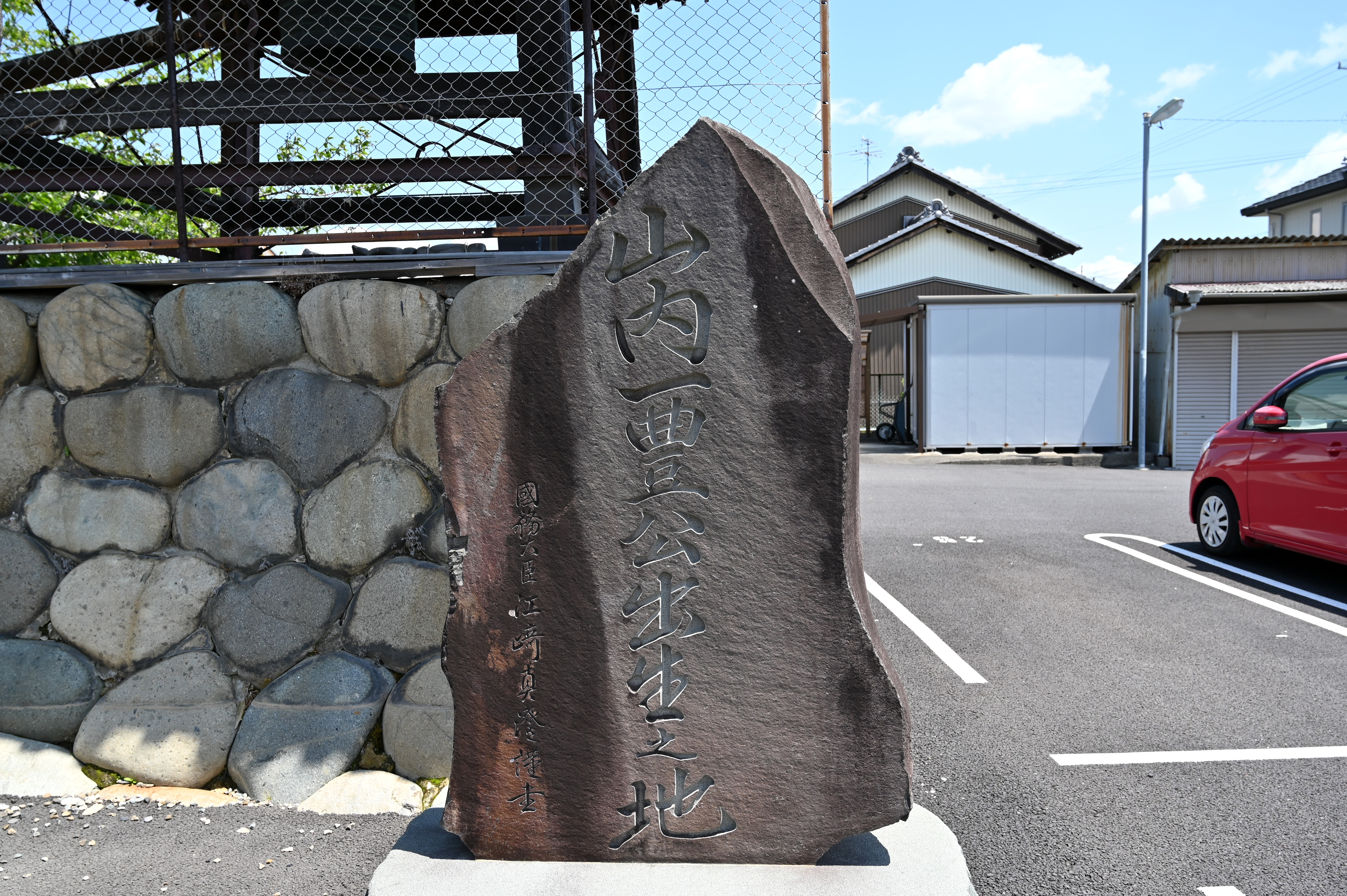
Houren-ji (Yamauchi Kazutoyo)

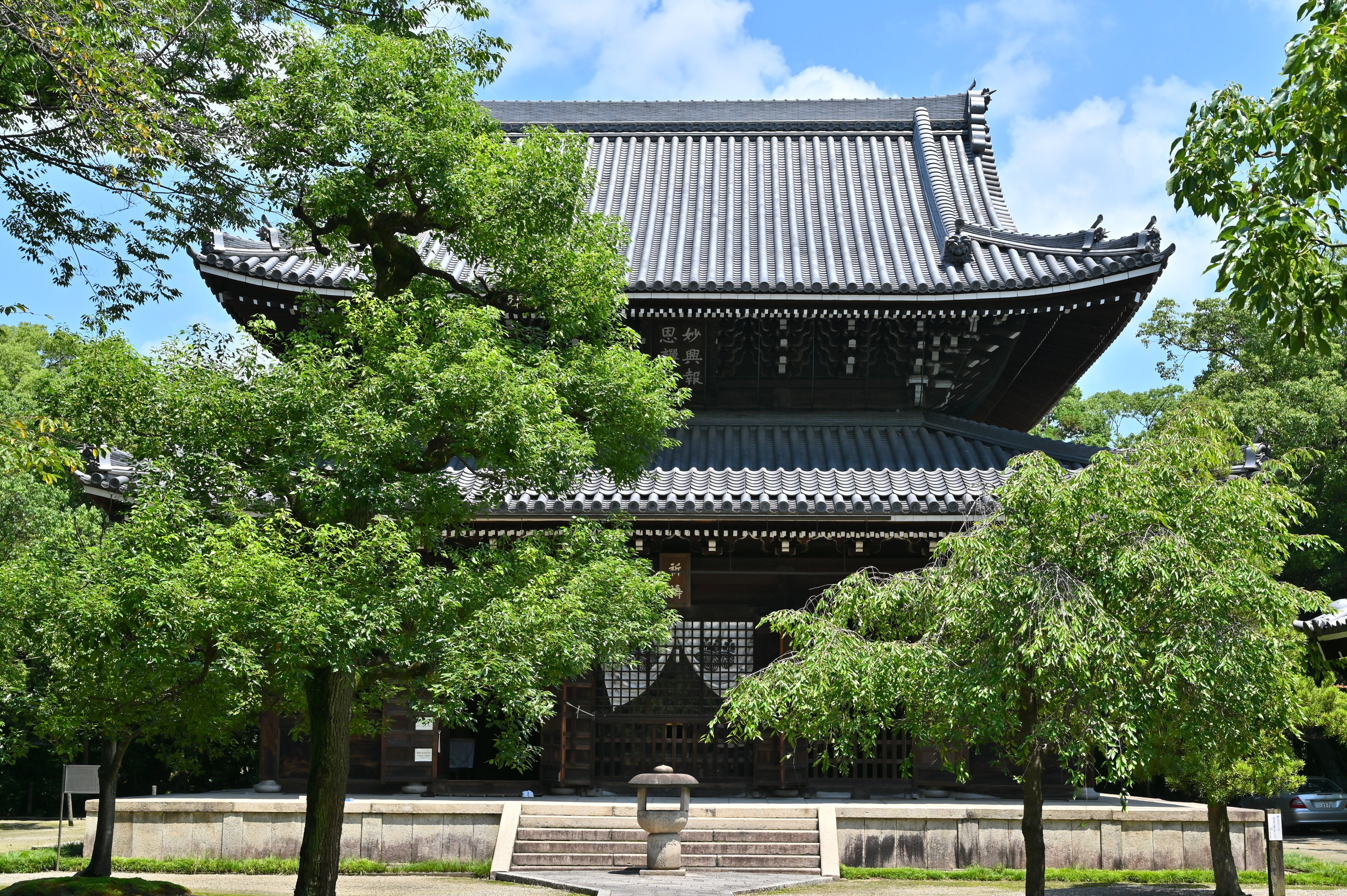
Myōkō-ji

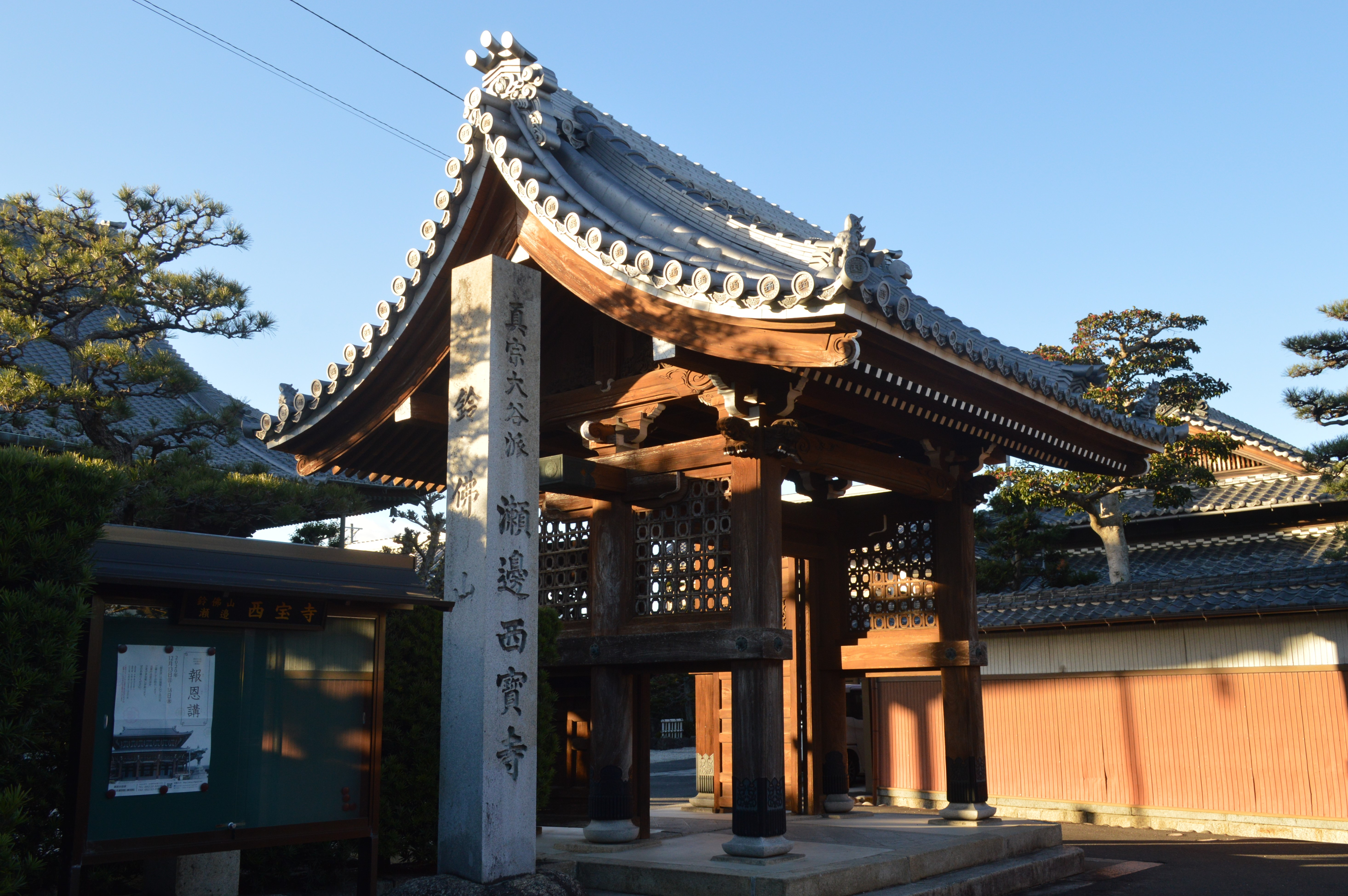
Sebe Saihō-ji

Shinto shrines

- Azai shrine
- Ifuribe shrine
- Iwato shrine
- Masumida Shrine
- Owari Ōmiwa Shrine
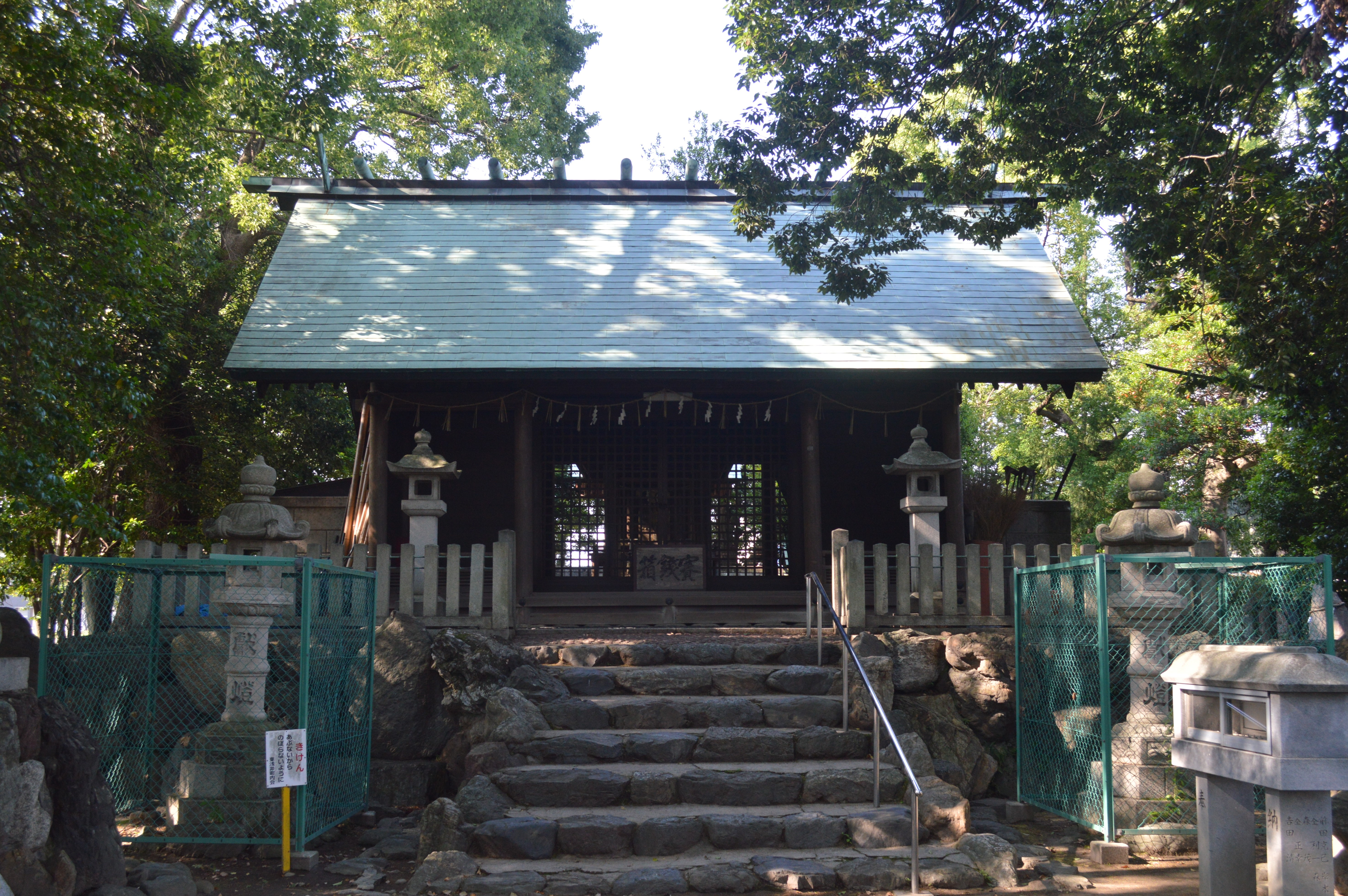
Azai jinja

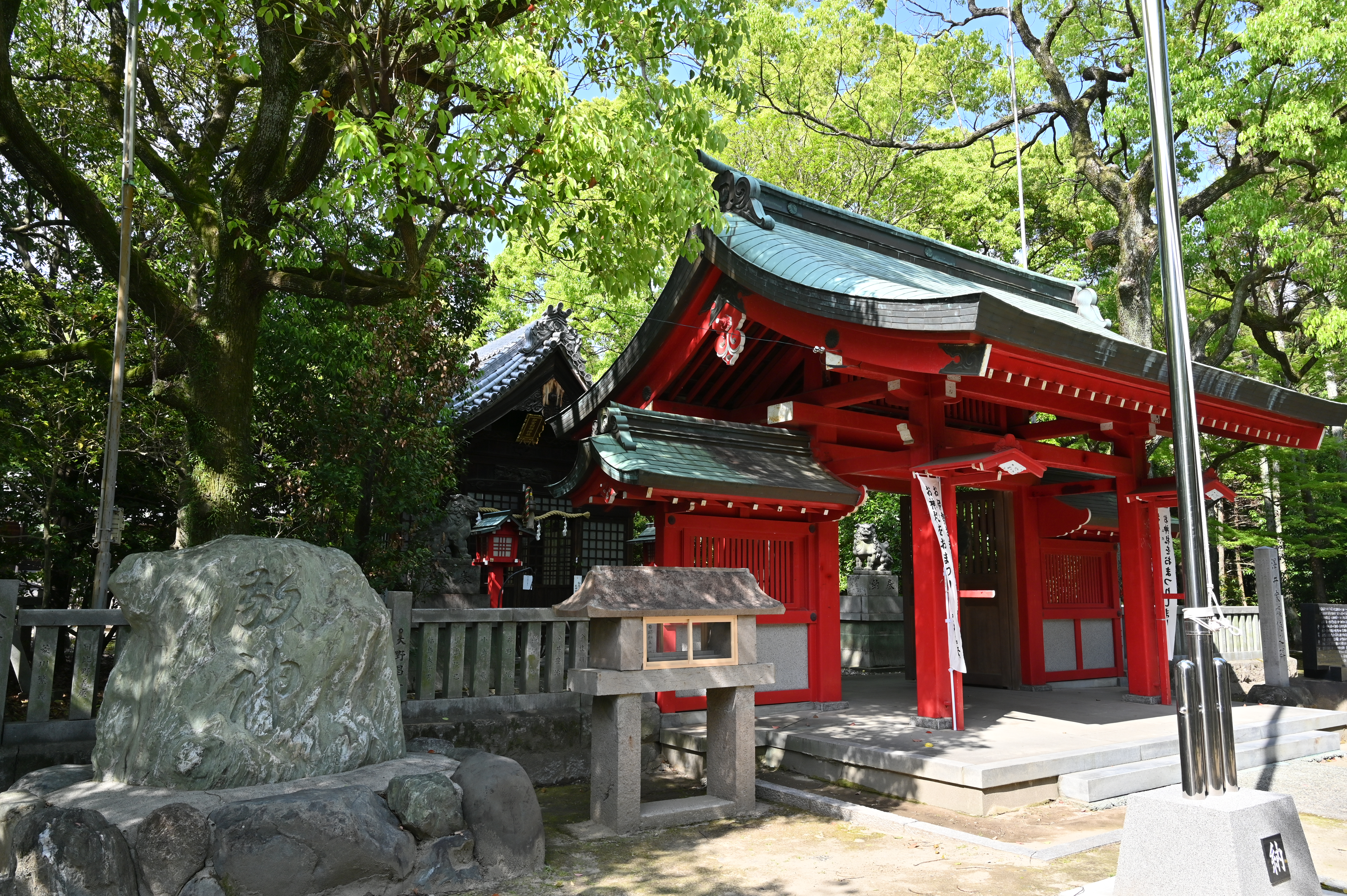
Ifuribe jinja

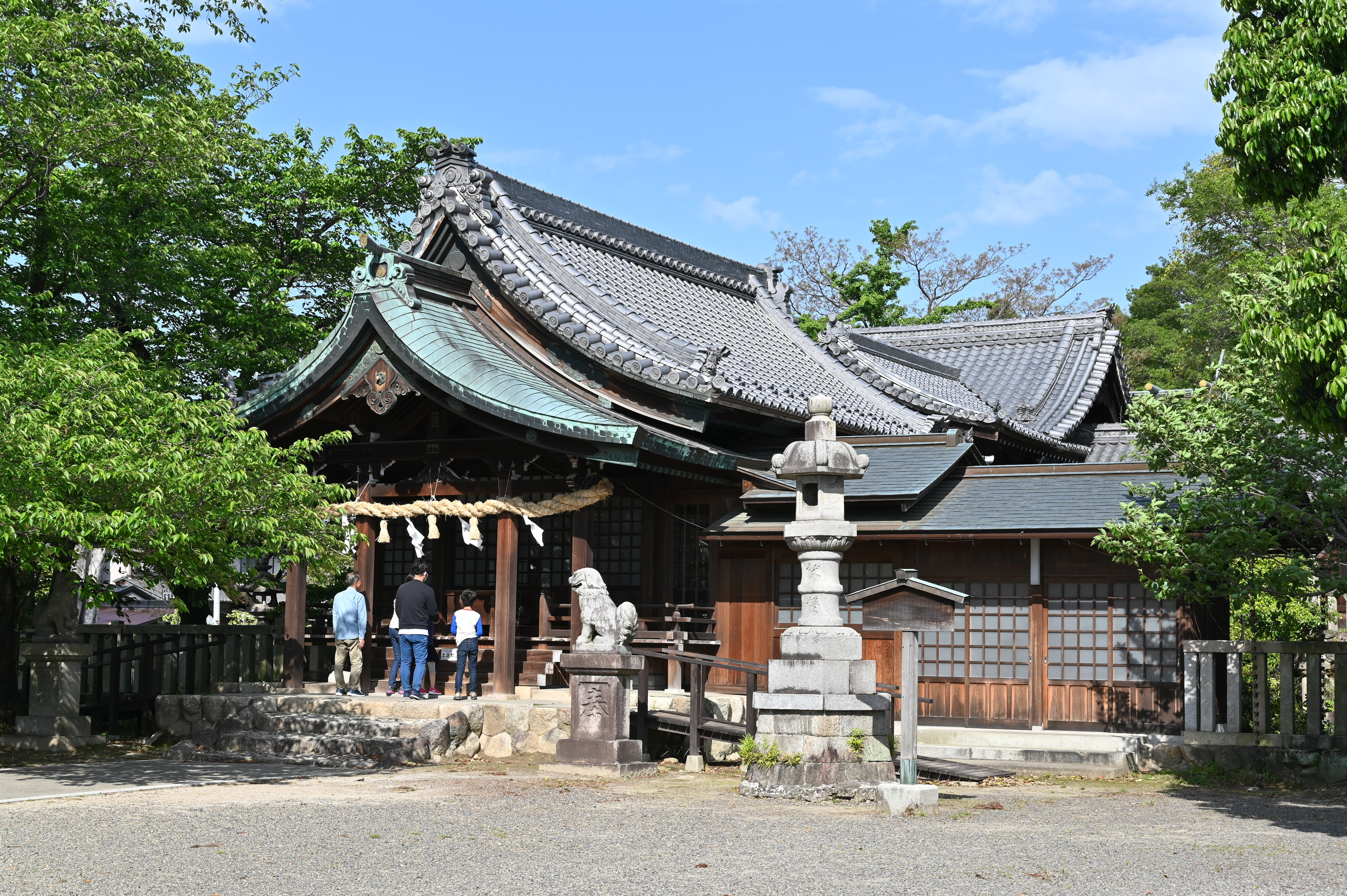
Iwato jinja

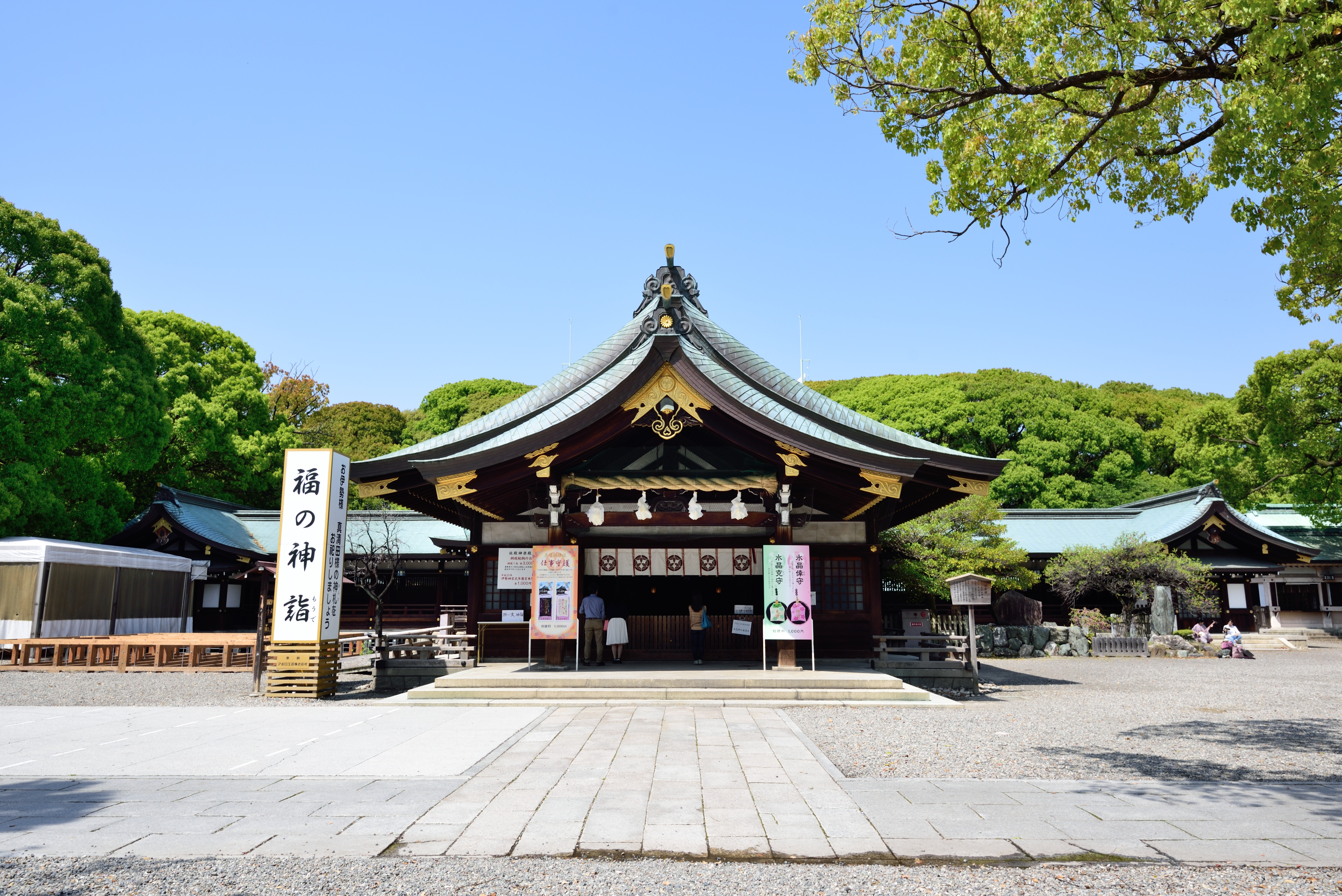
Masumida jinja

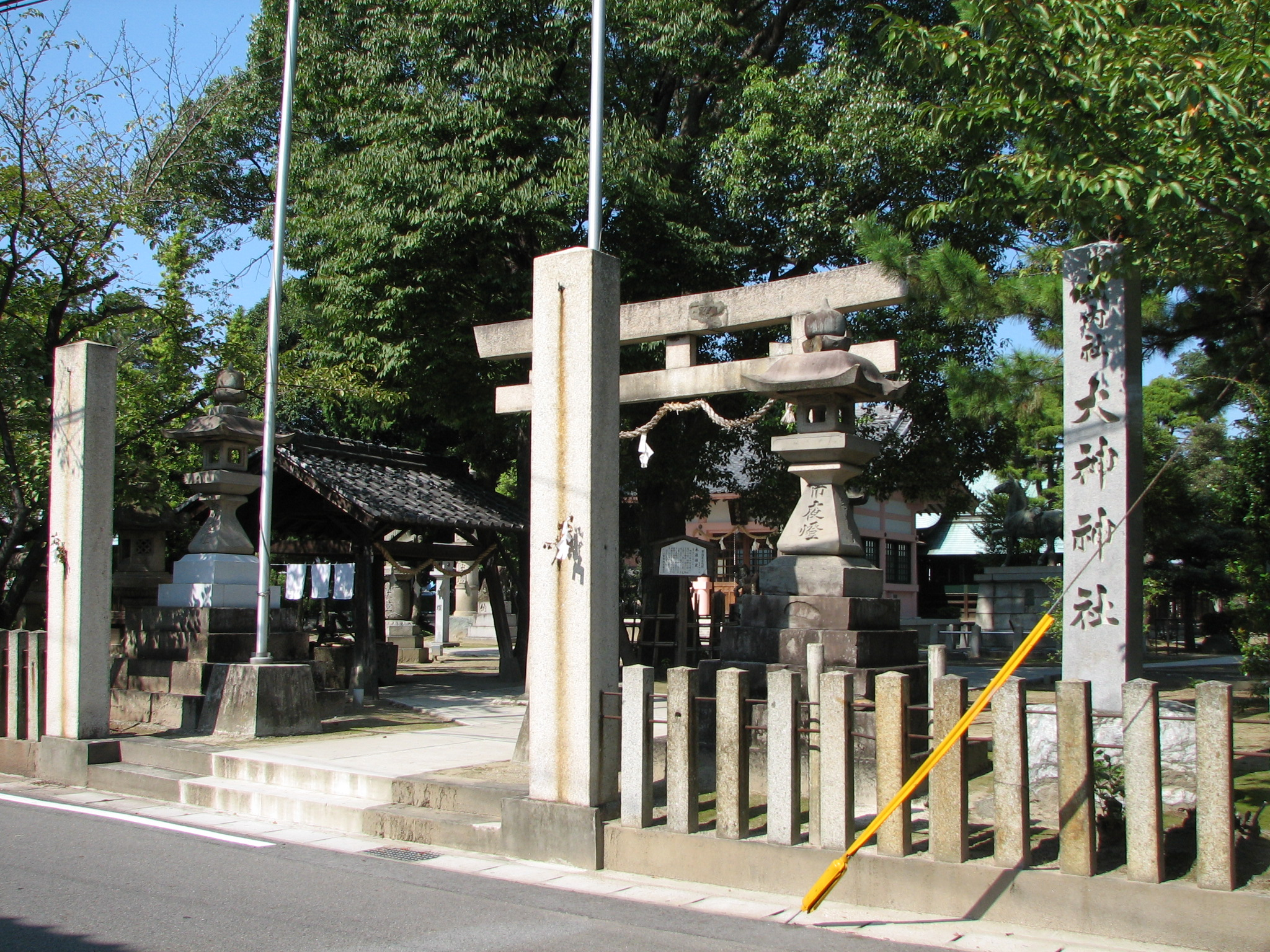
Owari Ōmiwa Shrine

Archaeological sites

- Mitsui Inariyama kofun
- Nekojima Site
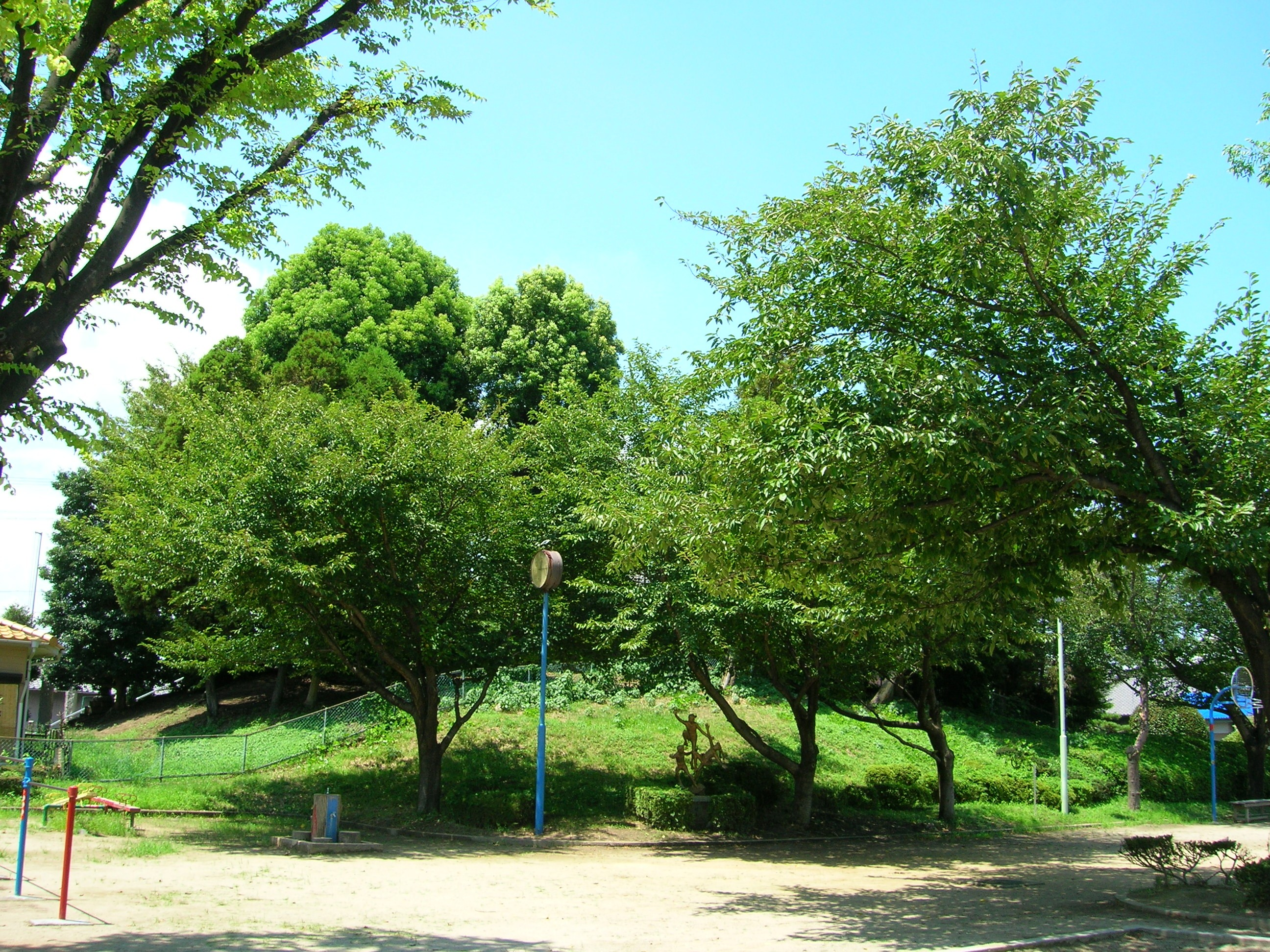
Mitsui Inariyama kofun

Park

- 138 Tower Park
- Asano Park
- Azaiyama Park
- Umegae Park
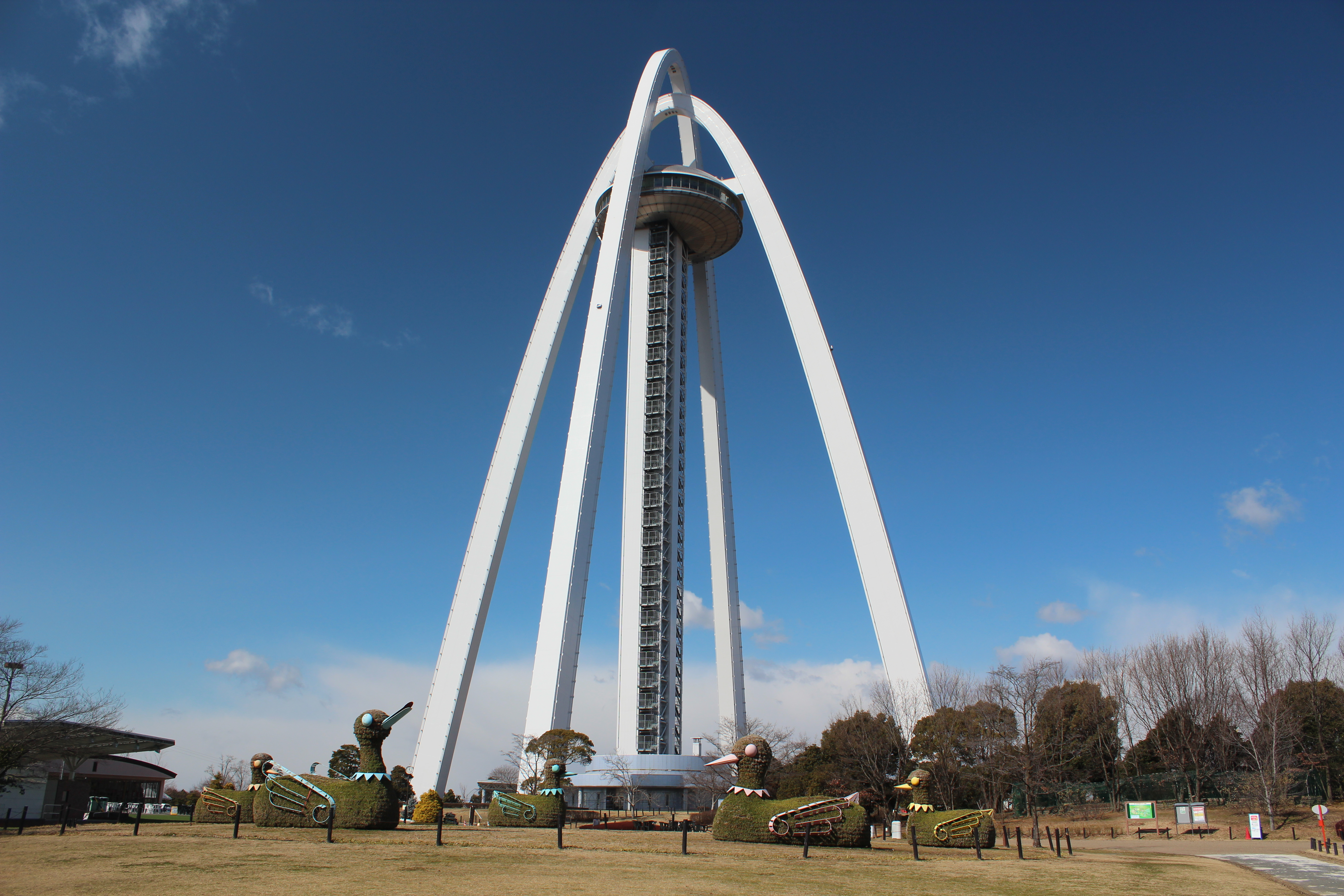
138 Towr Park

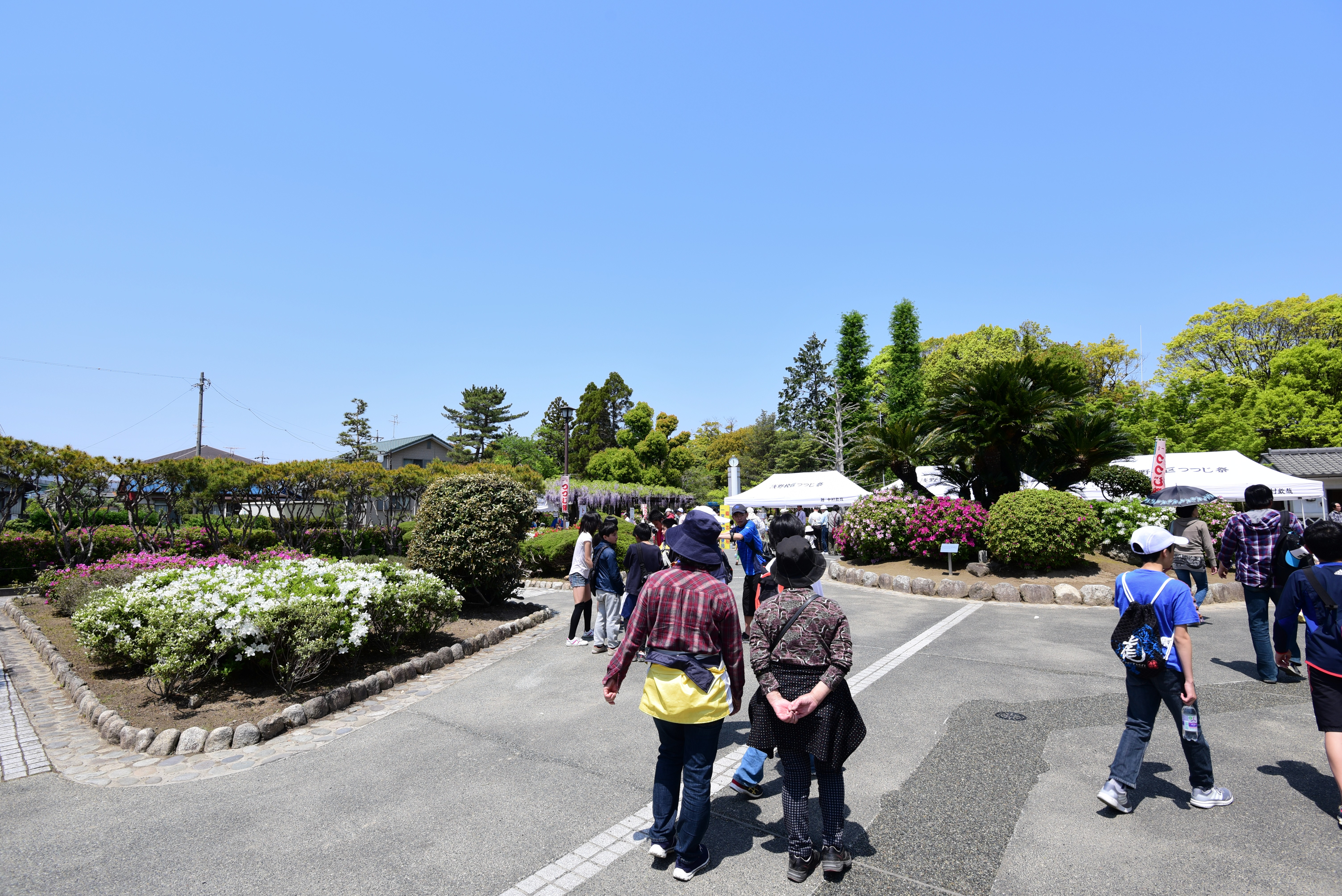
Asano Park

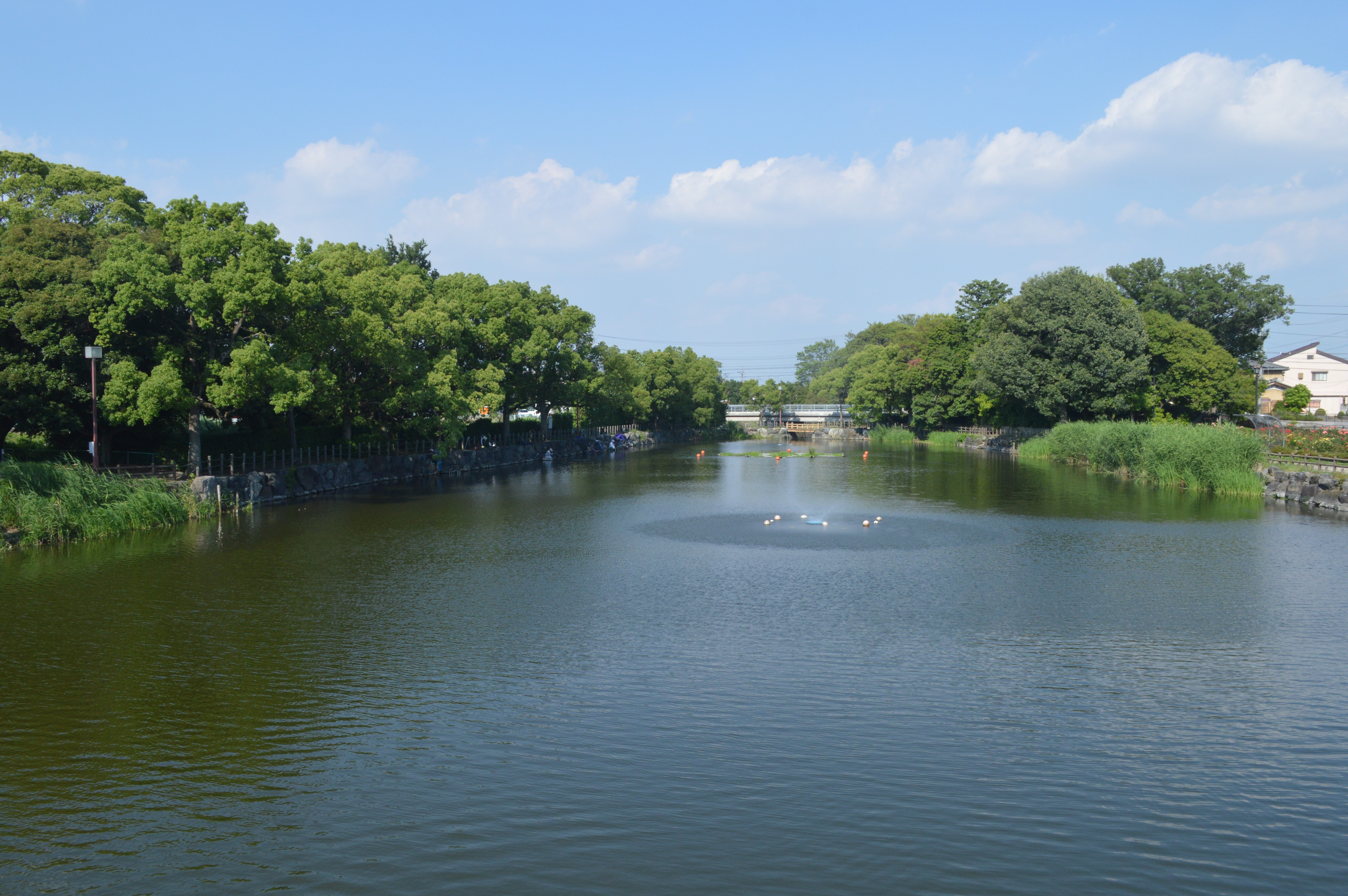
Azaiyama Park

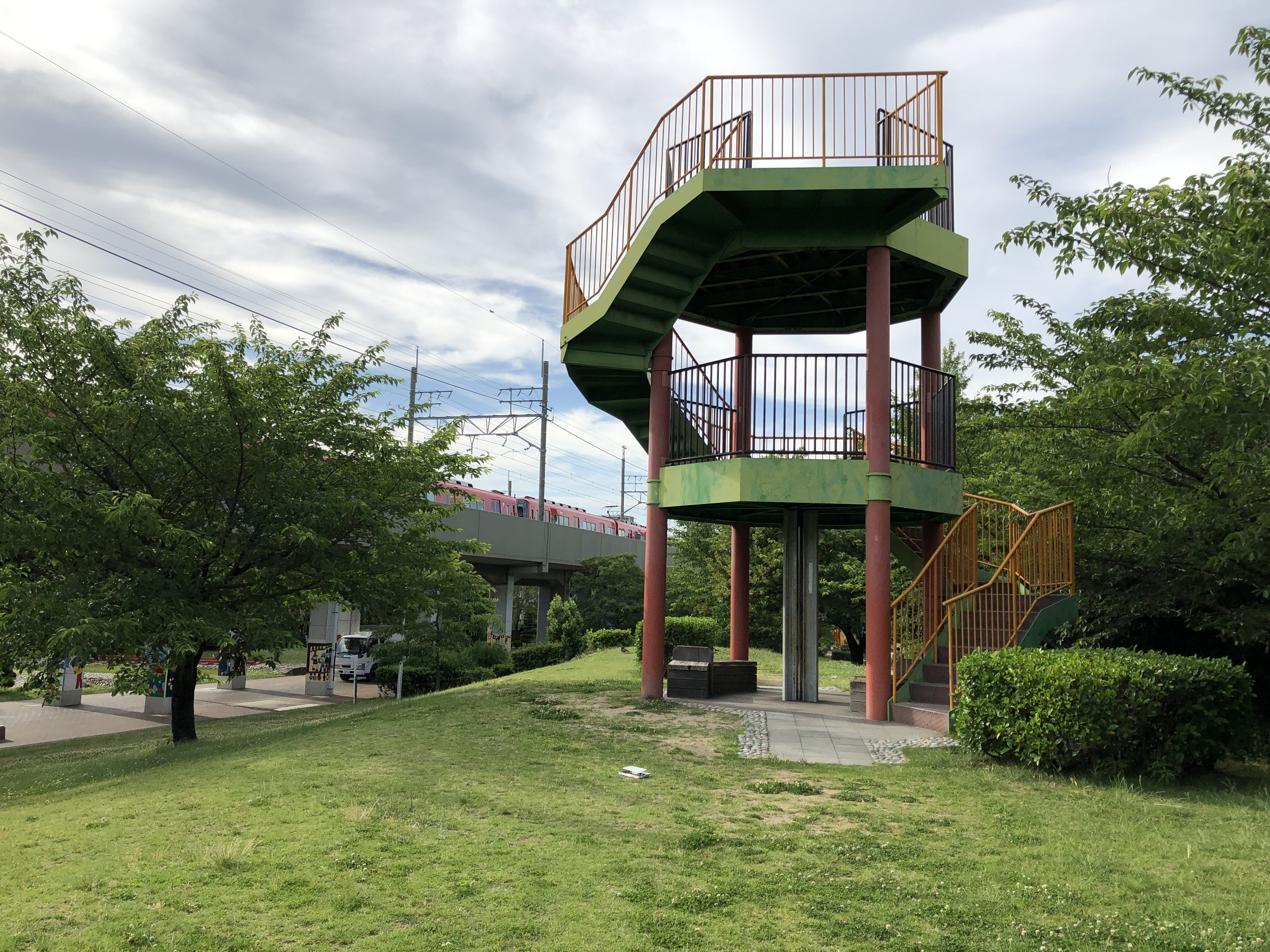
Umegae Park

== Culture ==
=== Festivals ===
- Ichinomiya Tanabata Festival (Double Seventh Festival)
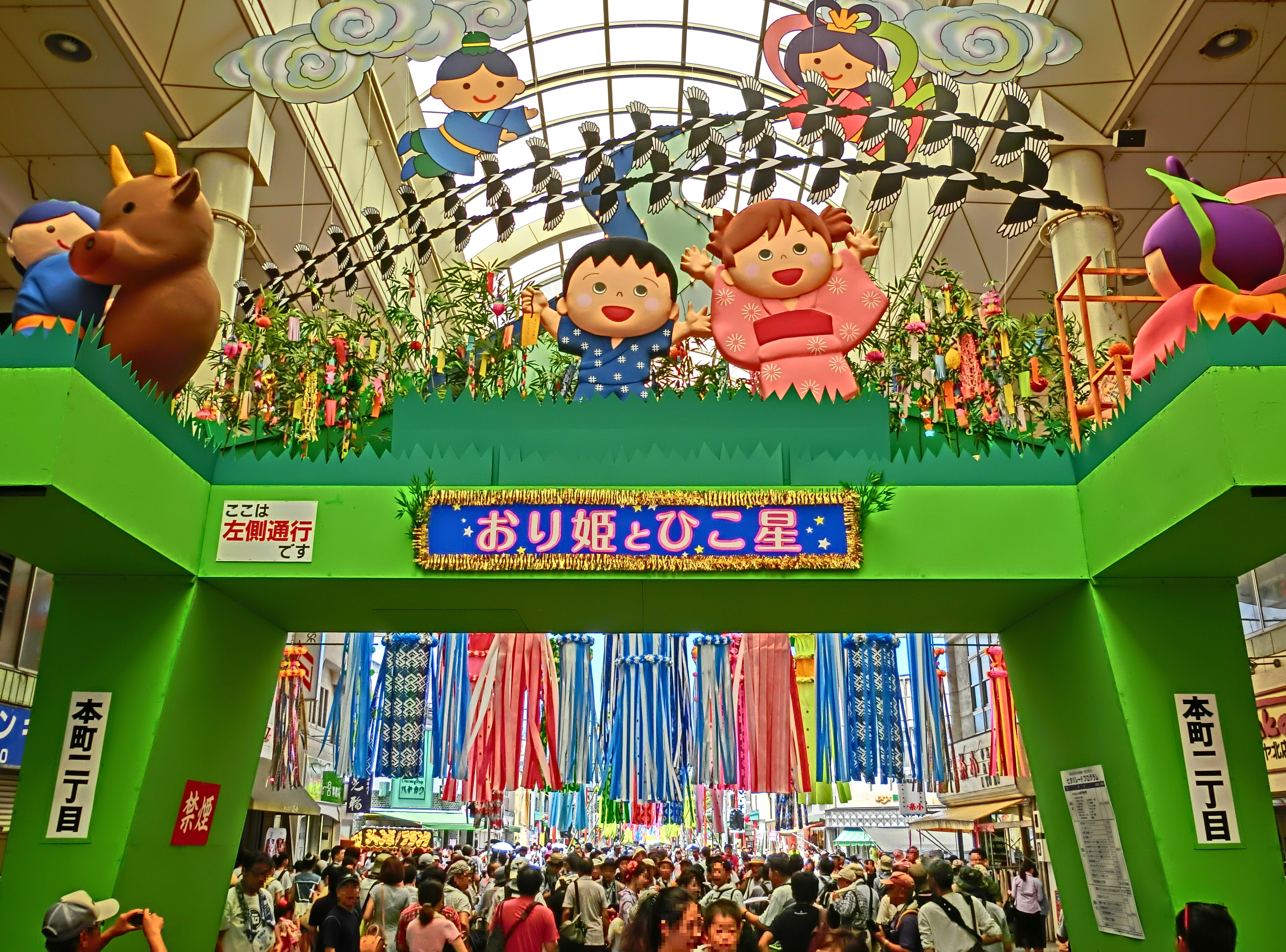
Ichinomiya Tanabata Festival

=== Sports ===
Sex	Name	competition	League	Home	Sponsor	Since
Women	Aichi Dione	Women's baseball	Japan Women's Baseball League	Ichinomiya Stadium; Hirashima Park Baseball Playing Grounds	Aichi Dione	2010
Women	Dream Citrine	Softball	Japan Softball League (JSL)	Ichinomiya Stadium; Hirashima Park Baseball Playing Grounds	Dream Citrine	2016
Women	Futsal Clube UNIAO Ladies	Women's Futsal	WOMEN'S F.LEAGUE	Ichinomiya Komyoji Park Playing Field; DIADORA Arena	UNIAO	2016
Women	TOKAI NEXUS	Women's baseball	Women's Baseball Federation of Japan	Ichinomiya Stadium; Hirashima Park Baseball Playing Grounds	TOKAI NEXUS	2020

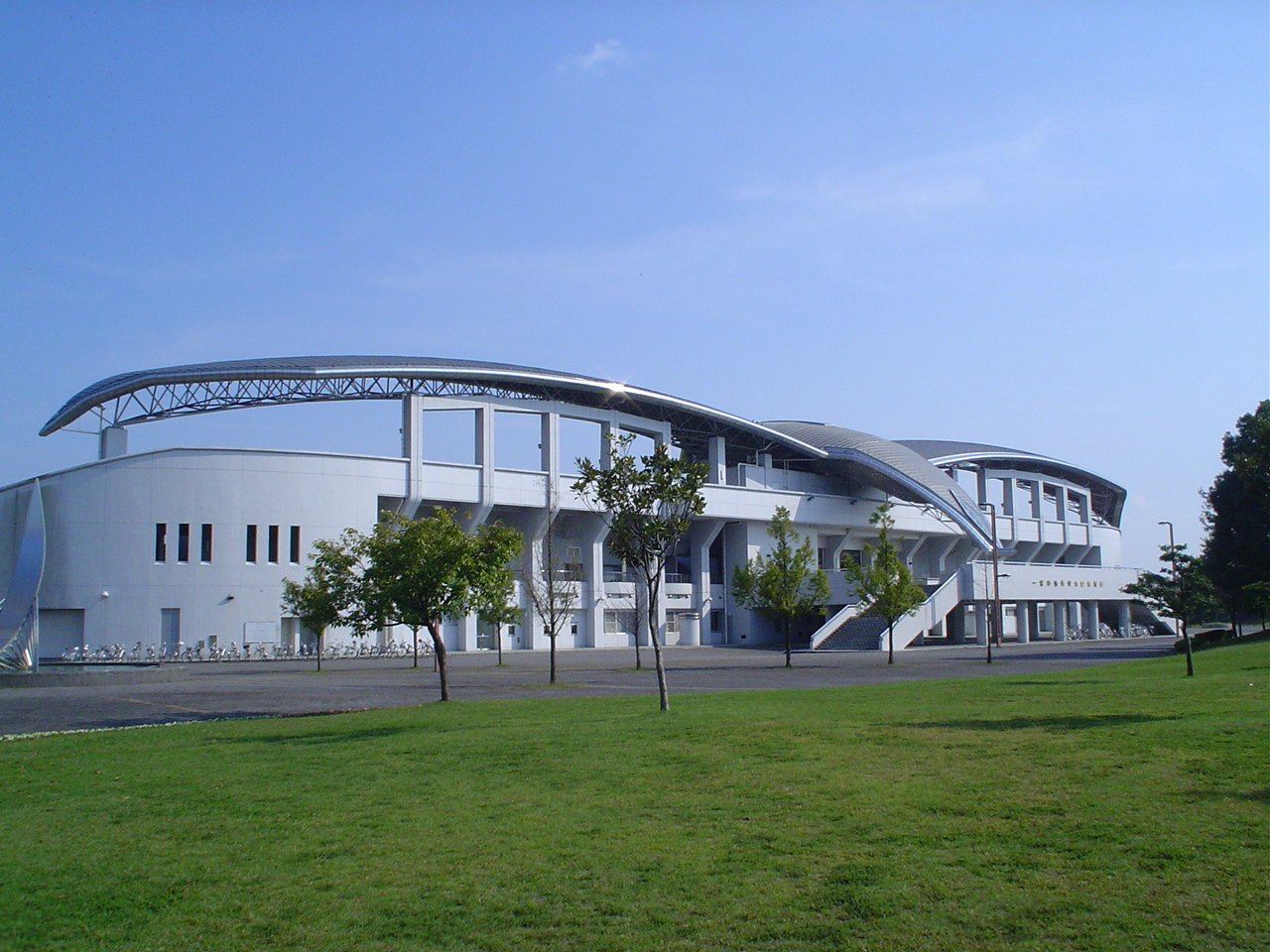
Kōmyoji Park Stadium

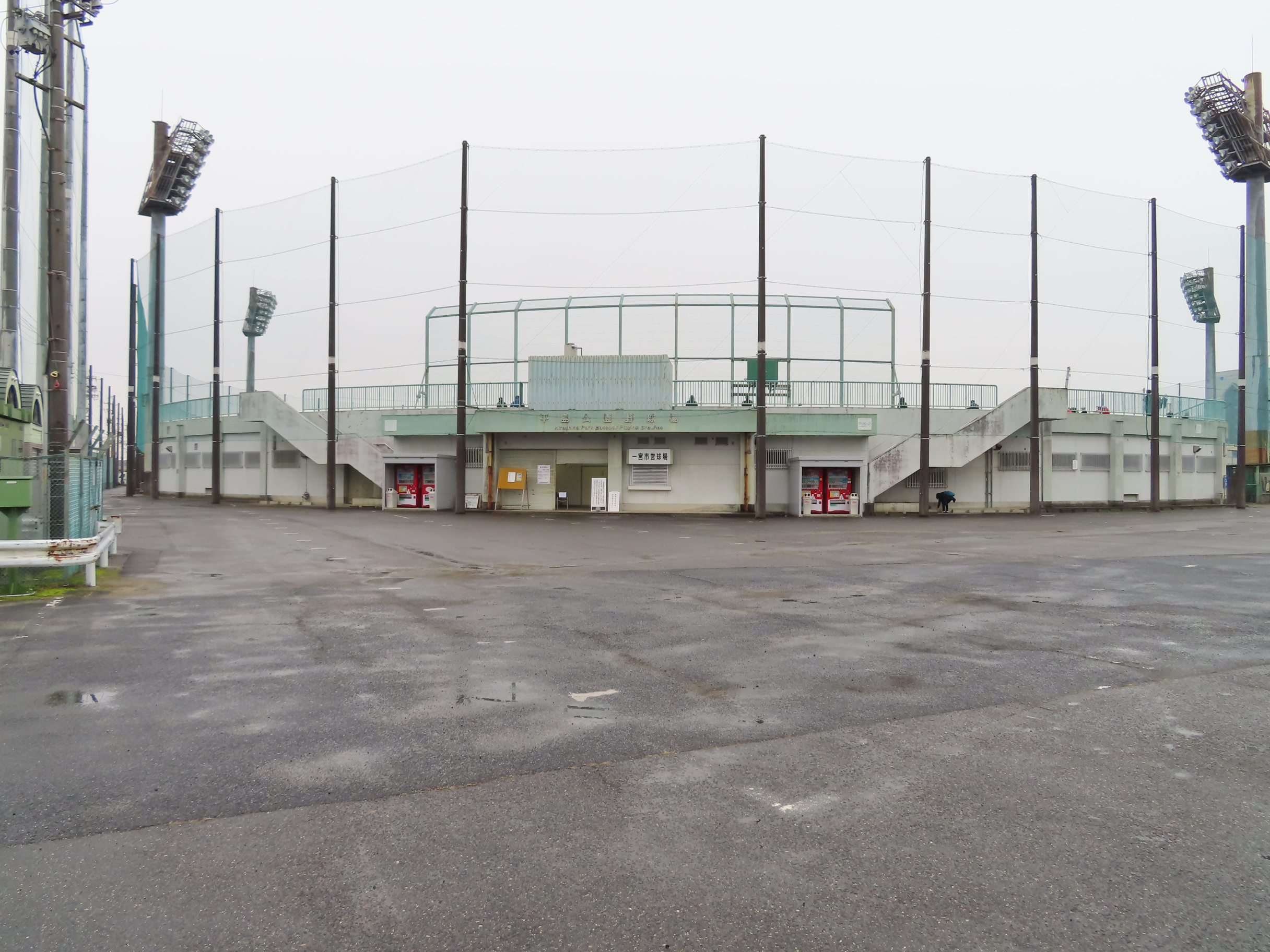
Hirashima Park Baseball Playing Grounds

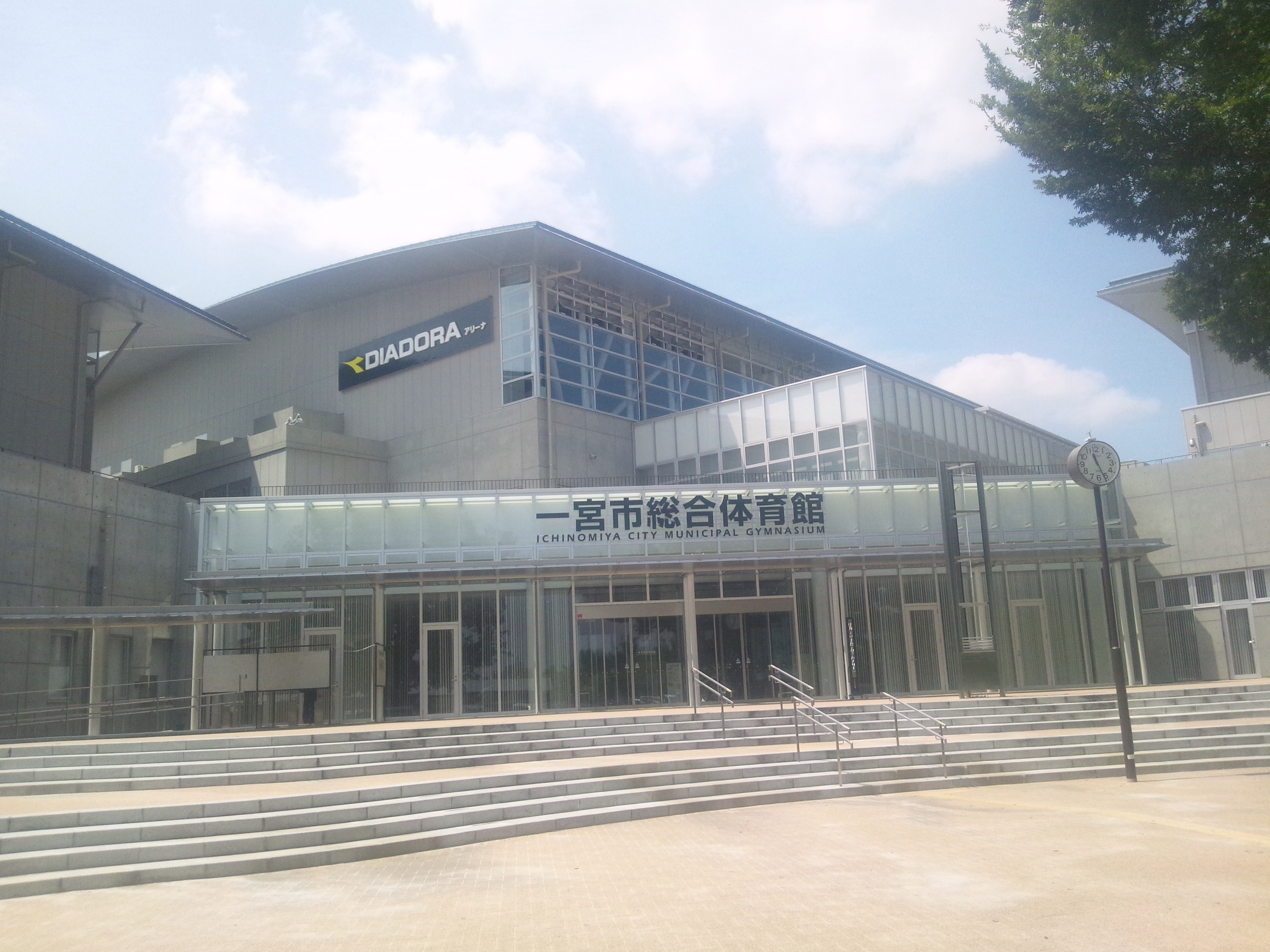
Ichinomiya Municipal Gymnasium (DIADORA Arena)

== Notable people from Ichinomiya ==
- Tetsuma Esaki, politician
- Ichikawa Fusae, politician
- Kazuo Funaki, actor
- Nao Hibino, tennis player
- Masaaki Kanda, politician
- Ryuichi Kihara, figure skater
- Rie Kitahara, actress, former idol
- Shinichi Kondoh, retired baseball player
- Jōji Matsuoka, movie director
- Tokito Oda (born 2006), champion wheelchair tennis player
- Yukiko Okada, singer
- Hisa Ōta, stage actress
- Tange Sakura, voice actress
- Haruka Tomatsu, voice actress
- Masayuki Toyoshima, shogi player
