= Curt Rothenberger =

German jurist and Nazi official (1896–1959)

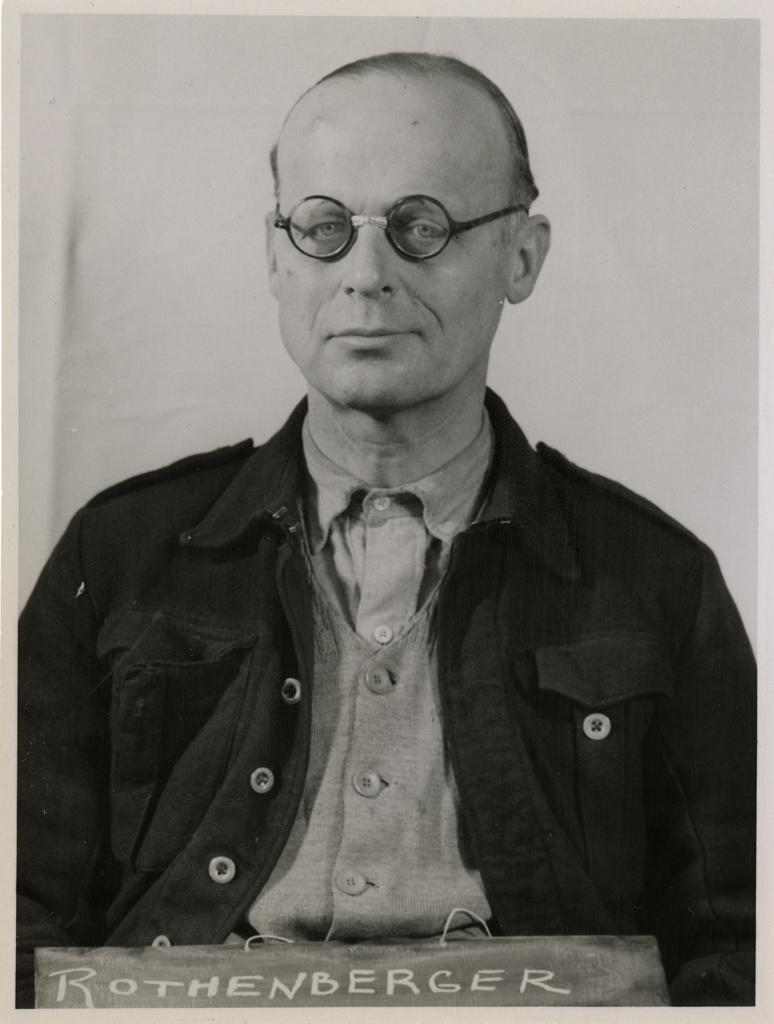
- Rothenberger, c. 1946–1947

State Secretary Reich Ministry of Justice
- In office 20 August 1942 – 21 December 1943
- Preceded by: Franz Schlegelberger
- Succeeded by: Herbert Klemm

Vice-president Academy for German Law
- In office 3 November 1942 – 12 August 1944
- Preceded by: Carl August Emge

President Hamburg Higher Regional Court
- In office 1 April 1935 – 20 August 1942

Senator for Justice Hamburg
- In office 7 March 1933 – 1 April 1935

Personal details
- Born: 30 June 1896 Cuxhaven, Hamburg, German Empire
- Died: 1 September 1959 (aged 63) Hamburg, West Germany
- Cause of death: Suicide by hanging
- Party: Nazi Party
- Education: Humboldt University of Berlin; Kiel University; Hamburg University
- Profession: Lawyer

Military service
- Allegiance: German Empire
- Branch/service: Imperial German Army
- Years of service: 1915–1918
- Rank: Leutnant of reserves
- Battles/wars: World War I
- Awards: Hanseatic Cross (Hamburg)

Curt Ferdinand Rothenberger (30 June 1896 – 1 September 1959) was a German lawyer, judge and Nazi legal theorist who rose to become the State Secretary in the Reich Ministry of Justice in Nazi Germany.

Rothenberger studied law at Humboldt, Kiel and Hamburg universities, and saw action on the Western Front during the First World War. Steadily working his way up through the Hamburg courts, he became chief presiding judge at the Landesgericht in 1932. He joined the Nazi Party in 1933, shortly after the Nazi seizure of power.

Along with a group of lawyers within the party, Rothenberger played a major role in imposing the Nazi ideology on the German legal system. He was made president of the Hamburg Higher Regional Court in 1935. Rothenberger installed party loyalists in leading judicial positions, purged Jewish judges, and advocated for continuing reforms well into the Second World War. In 1942, he was appointed State Secretary of the Reich Ministry of Justice. His radical proposals drew the ire of high-ranking party members including Martin Bormann, who arranged for his removal a year later, after which he worked as a notary in Hamburg.

Rothenberger was arrested by British troops at the end of the war. He was convicted of war crimes and crimes against humanity in the Judges' Trial at Nuremberg in 1947 and was sentenced to seven years imprisonment. Released in 1950, he resumed life in the legal profession until inquiries into his past arose publicly once again in early 1959, and he committed suicide shortly after.

== Education and early career ==
Rothenberger was born in Cuxhaven, then part of the state of Hamburg, the son of a customs official. He attended the prestigious Wilhelm-Gymnasium in Hamburg. He received his Abitur in August 1914, just days after the outbreak of the First World War. He volunteered for military service but, due to the logistical difficulties in processing the massive number of enlistees, he was placed on a waiting list and decided to begin his law studies at the Humboldt University of Berlin. He transferred to Kiel University in May 1915 but was called up for military service at the end of June. He served in a field artillery unit on the western front, earned the Hanseatic Cross and was discharged at the end of the war with the rank of Leutnant of reserves. He moved back to Hamburg and continued his legal studies at Hamburg University.

In March 1920, Rothenberger passed the Referendar examination, proceeded to complete a legal clerkship and passed the Assessor examination in June 1922. He then worked as an administrative lawyer and assistant judge in the Hamburg Amtsgericht (District Court). He became a judge at the Hamburg Landesgericht (Regional Court) in January 1925 and, in 1931, was promoted to its chief presiding judge. Shortly after the Nazi seizure of power, he joined the Nazi Party on 1 May 1933. From 1934 to 1942, he also served as the district leader (Gauführer) of the National Socialist Association of Legal Professionals in Gau Hamburg.

== Nazi jurist ==
Rothenberger was part of an unofficial group of lawyers within the Nazi Party, led by Hans Frank and Roland Freisler, whose aim was to transform the legal profession by installing loyal Party men in leading positions within the judiciary, thereby politicizing both the law and legal proceedings. In March 1933, Rothenberger was appointed to the Hamburg Senate as the Senator (minister) for Justice and set about putting these ideas into practice, insisting that all judges had to be "100% National Socialist" and had to maintain the trust and confidence of the Party officials. Where this was not the case, the judges faced summary dismissal. Jewish judges in Hamburg were removed from office as early as March 1933 under Rothenberger's orders.

Rothenberger advanced to president of the appellate Oberlandesgericht (Higher Regional Court) in 1935, a post he would hold until 1942. In addition, he was made a professor of civil law on the faculty of the University of Hamburg. Despite his strong Party loyalty, Rothenberger clashed with the Gestapo in 1938 over their practice of rearresting people who had been released from prison. When Rothenberger took the case of two Jehovah's Witnesses who had been arrested immediately following their release from eight months in prison for their religious activities, it was agreed that the Gestapo would end this practice except in cases where those released were continuing to offend.

== Judicial reform plans ==
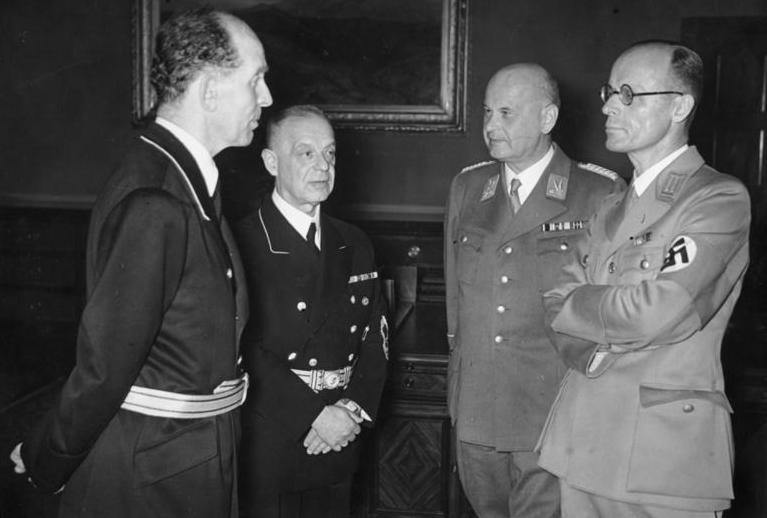
The four Nazi legal reformers together at the end of August 1942. Left to right Roland Freisler, Franz Schlegelberger, Otto Thierack and Curt Rothenberger

Rothenberger formulated many ideas regarding judicial reform. His goal was the "partification" of the judiciary by giving the Nazi Party close supervision of all judicial training. He sought a judiciary so attuned to the values and goals of the Party that it would uphold its wishes in all judicial decisions. In addition, he sought to expand the use of lay judges and people's courts at the expense of the professional judiciary at the local level. However, he argued that the dispensing of justice at the highest levels should remain in the hands of a proper, trained judiciary. In appeals cases, he advocated a greater reliance on the Führerprinzip by replacing multi-judge panels by a single judge.

Rothenberger sent his ideas about judicial reform to prominent legal expert and head of the Reich Chancellery Hans Lammers in early 1941; Lammers was not impressed and rejected the plan. Rothenberger then sent the same ideas to Deputy Führer Rudolf Hess, who proved keener but made his ill-fated flight to Scotland before he could act on them. Finally, in early 1942, Rothenberger condensed his ideas into a short memorandum and sent them to one of Adolf Hitler's adjutants that he knew, Alwin-Broder Albrecht. It was forwarded directly to the Führer by another adjutant, Albert Bormann, who worked in the Führer's Private Chancellery. Responding favorably, Hitler made a speech to the Reichstag on 26 April 1942, in which he sought to undertake a complete reform of the judiciary based on Rothenberger's proposed principles. The Reichstag immediately approved the requested resolution. However, Rothenberg's action in bypassing the Party Chancellery and approaching Hitler through the adjutant's office incurred the resentment of the Chancellery's powerful chief, Martin Bormann, and Rothenberg was suspect from that point on.

Some officials, particularly those high in the Party organization such as Bormann, believed the reforms did not go far enough. Others, however, saw Rothenberger's ideas as constituting unwarranted attacks on the judiciary. Hans Frank, the President of the Academy for German Law, a body which he had established in 1933, made a series of speeches in June 1942 at several universities defending the status quo as a protest against the Rothernberger proposals. As a result of this controversy, Frank was forced to resign from the Academy presidency on 20 August 1942.

== Reich Justice Ministry ==
In order to undertake the proposed changes, Hitler effectuated a total reshuffle of the highest judicial levels. Justice Minister Franz Schlegelberger was dismissed on 20 August 1942 and replaced by Otto Thierack, the President of the People's Court since 1936. Thierack was replaced by State Secretary Freisler, who in turn was succeeded as State Secretary by Rothenberger, who was immediately placed in charge of reforming the judicial system. In November 1942, Rothenberger also was made vice-president of the Academy for German Law, which now also was headed by Thierack, who had succeeded Frank.

Under Thierack and Rothenberger, Party officials substantially increased their direct interference in judicial affairs. Local Gauleiter were consulted on judicial appointments and felt free to try and impose their will on judicial outcomes. In politically sensitive cases involving Party officials, the ministry inserted itself into supervising the judicial process, demanding daily communication updates from the trial courts. In other types of cases, the ministry critiqued the handling and sentencing of cases by the trial courts and often demanded harsher punishments.

Thierack, after discussions with Hitler, concluded that "degenerate" inmates and serious offenders needed to be killed. How to distinguish between "reformable" and "incorrigible" offenders, and how to decide how these prisoners, once selected, should be murdered were issues that were debated in several meetings in September 1942 between Rothenberger and high-ranking SS officials, including SS-Gruppenführer Bruno Streckenbach from the Reich Security Main Office (RSHA). It was determined that prisoners deemed as "antisocial" were to be removed from prisons and turned over to the SS, to be worked to death in the Nazi concentration camps. It was agreed with Reichsführer-SS Heinrich Himmler that all Jews, Sinti and Romani people, Russians, and Ukrainians in state penal institutions were to be handed over without exception. Also to be included were all prisoners sentenced to preventive detention (Sicherungsverwahrung) and any Poles with sentences of more than three years. German and Czech inmates with penitentiary sentences of more than eight years were to be examined individually by a commission to determine whether they should be turned over. From late 1942 onward, it is estimated that this policy resulted in over twenty thousand offenders being taken out of the state penal system and transferred to the SS for "annihilation through labor".

In an incident on the night of 3–4 September 1943, three death row inmates managed to escape from Plötzensee Prison during an air raid when the prison was badly damaged. In response, Rothenberger ordered the immediate execution of all current death sentences to forestall additional escapes. From the nights of 7 September to 12 September 1943, over 250 prisoners were hanged, including some whose pardon requests were still pending.

Realising that the proposed reforms were causing too much friction at a time when the Second World War was beginning to turn against Germany, and thus were affecting public morale, Martin Bormann saw an opportunity to sabotage Rothenberger, whom he had long distrusted. Rothenberger's reform efforts were increasingly stymied, and Bormann finally succeeding in having Thierack dismiss him as State Secretary in December 1943 using a charge of plagiarism as a pretext. Bormann then installed his protégé from the Party Chancellery, Herbert Klemm, as State Secretary in his place. Rothenberger returned to Hamburg and worked as a notary.

== Post-war life ==
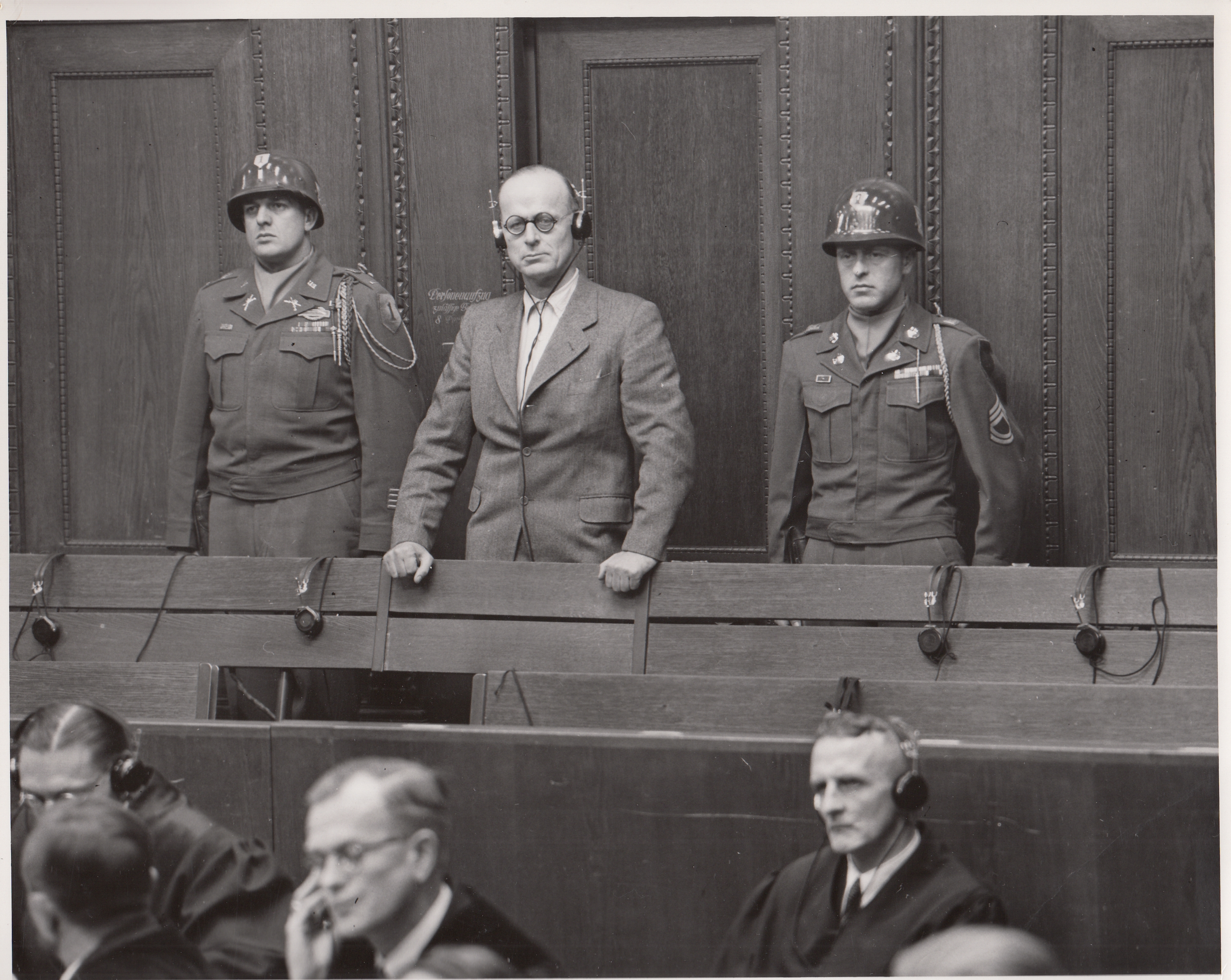
Rothenberger at his sentencing in Nuremberg, 4 December 1947

Following the German surrender, Rothenberger was arrested in Hamburg by British occupation troops and interned in Neumünster-Gadeland. In the subsequent Nuremberg Trials, Rothenberger was brought up on charges in the so-called Judges' Trial that opened on 5 March 1947 against 16 high-ranking judicial officials and judges of the Nazi regime. Three former state secretaries of the Justice Ministry, Rothenberger, Klemm and Schlegelberger, were defendants in the trial. He was charged with war crimes and crimes against humanity. He made one suicide attempt in his cell on 25 August.

Among the charges brought against Rothenberger were that he perverted and corrupted the justice system. He not only reproached and, in one case, removed subordinate judges for administering justice against Party officials, but also used his influence to achieve discriminatory actions favorable to Party officials and unfavorable to Poles and Jews. At the conclusion of the trial, he was found guilty and was sentenced by the American military tribunal on 4 December 1947 to seven years' imprisonment with credit for the time served in pre-trial detention.

After being credited with additional time off for good behavior, Rothenberger was released from Landsberg prison on 25 August 1950. He settled in Pönitz, a section of Scharbeutz in Holstein, underwent denazification procedures in 1951 at Kiel and was classified as Category V (exonerated). In addition, in October 1952, the state awarded him a full pension as a retired higher regional court president, worth 1200 DM per month. By 1954, he moved back to Hamburg and obtained employment as a lawyer and law examination tutor. In March 1959, an article in the Frankfurter Rundschau publicized his activities during the Nazi regime and by July an investigation was launched that could have implications for his employment and pension eligibility. On 1 September, Rothenberger committed suicide by hanging himself in his Hamburg home.

== Writings ==
- Der deutsche Richter (1943)
- Sechzehn Monate Berlin (1944)
