= Wilhelm von Ammon =

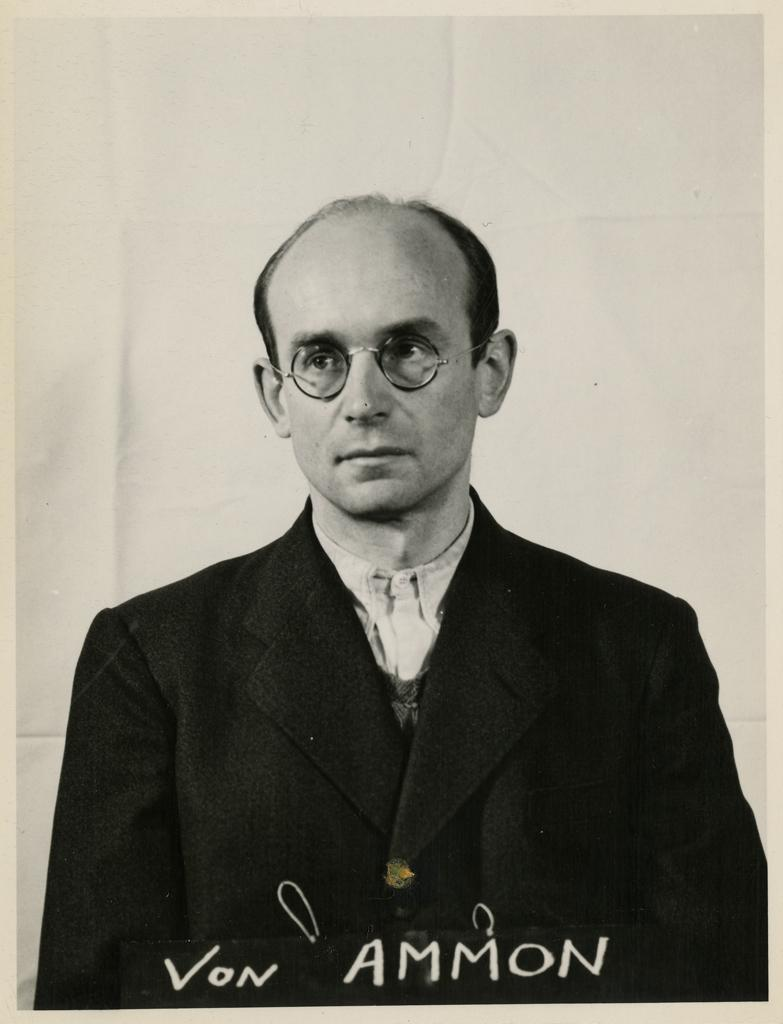
- Wilhelm von Ammon during the Nuremberg trials
- Born: March 17, 1903; Memmingen, German Empire
- Died: December 13, 1992 (aged 89); Stuttgart, Germany
- Status: Deceased
- Convictions: War crimes, Crimes against humanity
- Trial: Judges' Trial
- Penalty: 10 years imprisonment

Wilhelm von Ammon (17 March 1903 – 13 December 1992) was a German lawyer and a convicted Nazi war criminal. He was convicted after World War II for his role in the implementation of the Nacht und Nebel decree, a directive issued by Adolf Hitler which called for the imprisonment, forced disappearance, or death of political activists and resistance fighters in German-occupied Europe.

== Life ==
Wilhelm von Ammon was born on 17 March 1903 in Memmingen, German Empire.

Ammon studied law and became a member of the Bubenreuther fraternity during his studies in 1921. He received his doctorate in 1926 from the Ludwig-Maximilians-Universität München with his thesis titled “The Binding Illegal Order”. After the Nazi Party's seizure of power in 1933, he joined the Sturmabteilung and in 1935 became a district judge in the Reich Ministry of Justice. He was promoted to regional court director in June 1937, applied for admission to the NSDAP on 20 July that year and was admitted retrospectively from 1 May 1937.

After temporarily working at the Munich Higher Regional Court, Ammon was transferred back to the Reich Ministry of Justice in 1940, where he was promoted to ministerial councillor in March 1943. There he led the group that handled the Night and Fog decree measures under Wolfgang Mettgenberg. He presented the Minister of Justice, Otto Georg Thierack, and the State Secretary, Herbert Klemm, with “lists of many hundreds of death sentences,” which he had already classified as “smooth” or “doubtful.”

On 14 December 1947 Ammon was sentenced to ten years in prison in the Nuremberg judges' trial for his involvement in the implementation of the Night and Fog measures. On 3 February 1951, due to a request for clemency by High Commissioner John Jay McCloy, was released from Landsberg Prison. From 1957 to 1970 he was director of the Lutheran Regional Church Office in Ansbach and from the mid-1960s he also received a pension from his work as a ministerial councillor in the Reich Ministry of Justice. In 1971, Ammon also wrote a commentary on the Bavarian church constitution.

On 13 December 1993, Ammon died in Stuttgart, Germany.
