= Max Kaser =

German legal historian (1906–1997)

- Born: 21 April 1906; Vienna, Austro-Hungarian empire
- Died: 13 January 1997 (aged 90); Ainring, Bavaria, Germany
- Education: University of Graz; Ludwig-Maximilians-Universität München; University of Giessen
- Occupations: University professor of jurisprudence and legal history (Roman Law)
- Spouse: Erna Lehnig † 1991
- Children: 1. Wolfgang; 2. Eva Gerda

Max Kaser (21 April 1906 - 13 January 1997) was a German professor of Jurisprudence who taught successively at the University of Münster, the University of Hamburg, and the University of Salzburg. The principal focus of his scholarship and teaching was on Roman law. He became a member of a number of learned societies. In addition, between 1958 and 1992, he was awarded honorary doctorates by no fewer than ten different universities on three different continents. An eleventh honorary doctorate, from the Jurisprudence faculty at the University of Regensburg, was awarded only posthumously, however, in 1999.

Max Kaser is respected as the author of pioneering writings on the step by step progression from classical legal concepts to modern European civil law. His text books on Roman civil law and modern civil procedure (for many purposes outside Anglo-American common law precepts) break new ground in presenting the historical evolution of legal concepts and principals, incorporating analyses and commentaries on written sources, and using research techniques that he himself (with others) developed.

== Life ==
Max Kaser was born in Vienna where his father, the historian Dr. Kurt Kaser (1870–1931) worked at the time as a university tutor ("Privatdozent"). On both his father's side and his mother's sides, his ancestral roots tracked back through many generations of Austrian government administrators, lawyers, physicians, army officers and artists. Soon after his birth his father accepted an appointment which included an extraordinary professorship at the University of Graz, and the family relocated to that city. In 1914 the family moved again when Dr.Kurt Kaser accepted a full professorship at the University of Czernowitz (as it was then known), a couple of hundred kilometers south-west of Kyiv. The First World War and, more indirectly, its aftermath, brought about the need for further moves, and during the second part of his boyhood Max Kaser's family moved repeatedly between Czernowitz, Salzburg and Graz, as his father pursued his career as a university professor of medieval and modern history.

In 1924, Max Kaser enrolled at the University of Graz where between 1924 and 1928 he studied Jurisprudence. He was taught by Artur Steinwenter who taught Roman law, and whom Kaser would always single out as a powerfully positive influence, on account of his "extensive knowledge and exceptionally well-balanced judgement". The two would remain firm friends until Steinwenter's death in 1959. A student contemporary at the University of Graz was Walter Wilburg who later achieved eminence as a legal scholar and lawyer, and who also became a life-long friend. He received his doctorate at the University of Graz, awarded on 19 November 1928. Many years earlier, Ludwig Kaser (1841–1916), his grandfather, had also received a doctorate in Jurisprudence at the University of Graz. It was on the recommendation of his doctoral supervisor, Steinwenter, that Max Kaser switched in 1929 to the Ludwig-Maximilians-Universität München where he was supported by a scholarship. He was taught by Leopold Wenger at the university "Institute for Papyrus Research and Legal History in Antiquity" ("Institut für Papyrusforschung und antike Rechtsgeschichte"). The primary focus of his research was a question arising from the Roman civil law of property which two years later formed the based for Kaser's habilitation and his book "Restituere als Prozeßgegenstand" (1932: republished with extensive further notes in 1968).

Meanwhile he delivered a programme of lectures at the University of Frankfurt am Main during the winter 1930/31 term before moving on to the nearby University of Giessen where he worked as a research assistant to Otto Eger. It was Eger who supervised Kaser for his habilitation degree which he received in June 1931.

In 1932 he accepted a teaching post at the University of Münster where he took over from Hans Kreller who had transferred to the University of Tübingen. In October 1933, still aged only 27, he accepted a full professorship in Civil and Roman law. He would remain at the University of Münster until 1959. Although his duties required him to take in interest in Civil law, his strong preference for Roman law was never in doubt. An administrative post was added in April 1937, when he was made dean of the law faculty. In this post he won and retained, through the energy and ability that he brought to the job, the confidence of his mostly rather conservative senior colleagues, while quietly resisting pressure to pander to Germany's increasingly institutionalised Nazism which he characterised (quietly) as an "Anticulture" ("Unkultur").

For Max Kaser, 1933 was the year in which he met Erna Lehnig whose mother's family came from the Münster region. Her father's family came from the coastal region of Pomerania. By the end of 1933, the two were married, demonstrating through their "Austrian-north German partnership" a "perfect harmony" as Kaser later wrote. It was both a loving and an efficient partnership. Erna Kaser proved a highly competent administrator, running the house - even to the point, slightly unusually for a "housewife" at that time, of taking care of the family's annual tax declaration - leaving her husband to concentrate on his work at the university. The marriage also produced, in rapid succession, a son and a daughter. Meanwhile, Kaser's academic career and reputation progressed. He received and rejected apparently attractive offers of professorships from Heidelberg University, the University of Freiburg and Marburg University in 1937, 1939, 1940, in every case preferring to stay put at the University of Münster "at [his] own wish", as he expressed the matter at the time in a letter to a colleague.

When war broke out in 1939 Kaser, despite being still relatively young, was exempted from military service on account of a serious heart defect. However, as the slaughter of war intensified such matters counted for less, and in November 1943 he was conscripted into the army. He was initially engaged in anti-aircraft warfare but was soon sent back to Münster where he worked as a clerk for the regimental administration ("Regimentsstab"). The army permitted him still to lecture at the university for two days each week. In April 1945, the Americans came. War ended a month later and Max Kaser became a prisoner of war. He was held in various American and French camps till his release, which followed in 1946. He returned to the University of Münster and resumed his teaching. The National Socialists had had their own views on Roman law. They found it "materialistic" and incompatible with their racist ideals, so they planned to replace the German legal code with their own People's Legal code which would (among other things) remove the influence of Roman Law over the German system. But now they were gone. Kaser could now be less constrained in his lecturing, his writing and on his networking. His reputation continued to grow. Offers of professorships came from Marburg University (again) and Heidelberg University (again). There were also offers from the University of Graz (1951), the University of Göttingen (1952) and the University of Vienna (1959). Until 1959 he rejected all such offers.

When, in 1959, Kaser finally accepted an invitation to move, it was to accept a professorship at the University of Hamburg where he sustained a successful career in academic teaching and research till his formal retirement in 1971. Three of his personally supervised habilitation students from his time at the University of Hamburg subsequently achieved eminence as university professors of jurisprudence. (Note: Habilitation degree students personally supervised by Max Kaser who have subsequently achieved distinction include: Goethe University Frankfurt: Hans-Peter Benöhr; University of Münster: Fritz Schwarz; University of Hamburg: Dieter Medicus, Frank Peters, Hans Hermann Seiler and Rolf Knütel; University of Salzburg: Karl Hackl; Among some of the other of Max Kaser's students who achieved subsequent notability are or were Andreas Wacke, Jens Peter Meincke, Karlheinz Misera, Marianne Meinhart and Peter Apathy. An admirer recalls that Kaser liked to keep in touch with his former students, who came to value him as a patient advisor and trusted friend.) One of these, Dieter Medicus, later wrote an affectionate obituary in which he surmised that Kaser's decision to retire from his professorship at the University of Hamburg had been accelerated by the student unrest of 1968 and its aftermath. He found himself unable to endorse or even to understand either the methods employed or the objectives of those involved. Whatever the truth of the matter, his retirement from the University of Hamburg certainly did not mark an end to an active career as a law professor at a top university.

Between 1971 and 1976, Kaser held a special professorship at the University of Salzburg, occupying the teaching chair for Roman and Civil law. He obtained the position following discussion with Theo Mayer-Maly and Wolfgang Waldstein. He let it be known to his friends that he very much relished the chance to teach Roman law to students who were not motivated by the tightly prescriptive regime under which study and exams were operated in the German system. He continued teaching at the University of Salzburg until 1985, by which time he was almost 80.

Between 1954 and 1972, Max Kaser was a co-producer of Zeitschrift der Savigny-Stiftung für Rechtsgeschichte (ZRG), a specialist journal for scholars and students of historical jurisprudence and related topics.

== Memberships ==
Max Kaser was a member of various learned societies and other scholarly associations, some of which are listed below:

- In 1959 he became a full member of the Akademie der Wissenschaften zu Göttingen ("Göttingen Academy of Sciences and Humanities").
- In 1960 he became a foreign member of the Accademia delle Scienze di Torino ("Turin Academy of Sciences and Humanities").
- In 1968 he became a member of the Naples Accademia delle Scienze ("Academy of sciences").
- In 1969 he became a foreign member of the Milan-based Istituto Lombardo Accademia di Scienze e Lettere ("Lombard Academy of Sciences and Letters ").
- In 1971 he became a member of the Rome-based Accademia Nazionale dei Lincei (literally, "[Italian] Academy of the lynxes").
- In 1972 he became a member of the Österreichische Akademie der Wissenschaften ("Austrian Academy of Sciences and Humanities").
- In 1973 he became a corresponding member of the Bayerische Akademie der Wissenschaften ("Bavarian Academy of Sciences and Humanities") in Munich.
- In 1973 he became a member of the London-based British Academy.
- In 1975 he was elected an honorary member of the Society for the Promotion of Roman Studies in London.
- In 1988 he became a member of the Ακαδημία Αθηνών ([modern] "Academy of Athens").

== Celebration and recognition ==
The "Max Kaser Seminar" at the University of Salzburg is named in Kaser's honour. The seminar's library, set up in 1966, consists of books, newspapers and other printed material by Ernst Levy, Erich Sacher and Max Kaser himself. The collection is meticulously kept up to date.

Kaser's text books about Roman Civil Law and Roman legal history more broadly are widely studied and respected. They have been translated into a number of languages including English, Dutch, Finnish, Spanish, Japanese and Korean.

- 1971 Österreichisches Ehrenzeichen für Wissenschaft und Kunst (loosely, "Austrian badge of honour for arts, sciences and humanities")
- 1977 William Hartel Prize
- Verdienstorden der Bundesrepublik Deutschland ("Order of Merit of the Federal Republic of Germany")
- 1986 Goldene Ehrenzeichen des Landes Salzburg ("Golden badge of honour from the state of Salzburg")

Max Kaser also received a large number of honorary doctorates. (Note: Some universities that awarded honorary doctorates to Max Kaser: 1958 Federal University of Rio de Janeiro; 1962 University of Glasgow; 1965 University of Paris; 1966 University of Bordeaux; 1968 University of Graz (Dr. rerum politicarum); 1970 University of Innsbruck; 1973 University of Pretoria; 1975 University of Camerino; 1992 University of Naples Federico II; 1992 Complutense University of Madrid; 1999 University of Regensburg (posthumously))
