= Franz Schlegelberger =

German politician (1876–1970)

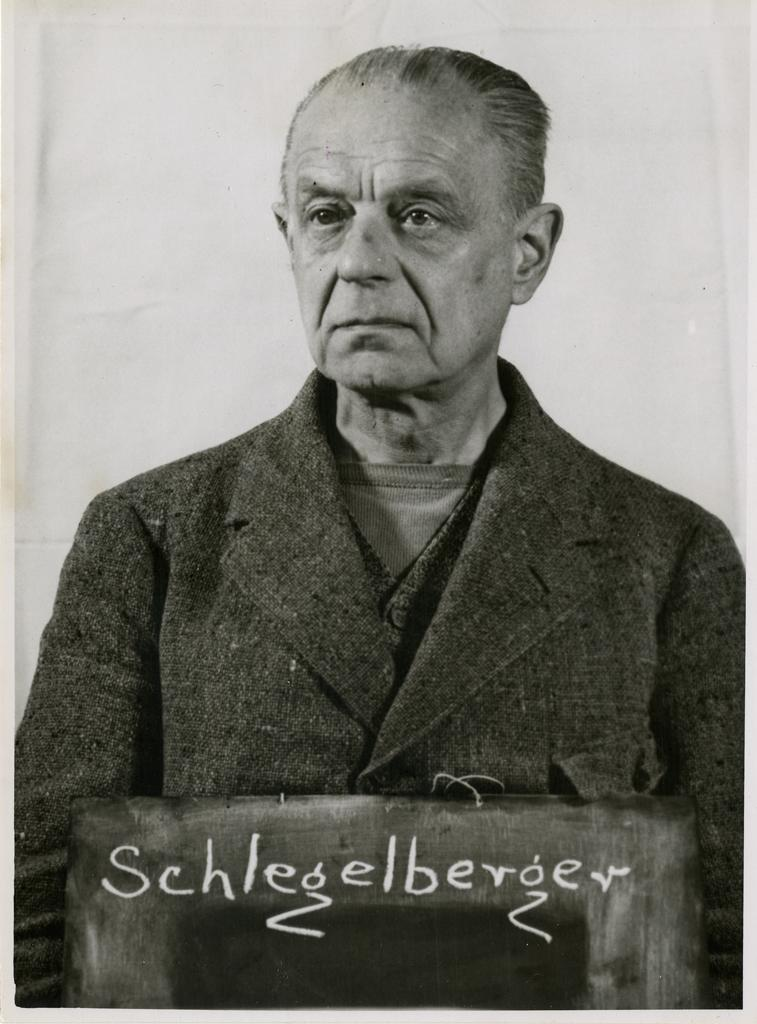
- Schlegelberger (aged 71) at the Nuremberg Judges' Trial

Reich Minister of Justice
- In office 30 January 1941 – 20 August 1942
- President: Adolf Hitler (as Führer)
- Chancellor: Adolf Hitler
- Preceded by: Franz Gürtner
- Succeeded by: Otto Georg Thierack

Personal details
- Born: 23 October 1876 Königsberg, Province of East Prussia, German Empire
- Died: 14 December 1970 (aged 94) Flensburg, Schleswig-Holstein, West Germany
- Party: Nazi Party

Louis Rudolph Franz Schlegelberger (23 October 1876 – 14 December 1970) was State Secretary in the German Reich Ministry of Justice (RMJ) who served as Justice Minister during the Third Reich. He was the highest-ranking defendant at the Judges' Trial in Nuremberg.

== Early life ==
Schlegelberger was born into a Protestant salesman's family in Königsberg. He graduated from the University of Königsberg – or according to documents from his trial the University of Leipzig – in 1899 attaining the degree of Doctor of Law. In 1901 Schlegelberger passed the state law examination and became a court Assessor at the Königsberg local court. In 1904 he became a judge at the State Court in Lyck (now Ełk). In early May 1908, he went to the Berlin State Court and in the same year was appointed assistant judge at the Berlin Court of Appeals (Kammergericht). In 1914 he was appointed to the Kammergericht Council (Kammergerichtsrat) in Berlin, where he stayed until 1918.

On 1 April 1918 Schlegelberger became an associate at the Reich Justice Office. On 1 October of that year, he was appointed to the Secret Government Court and Executive Council. In 1927, he was appointed as Ministerial Director in the RMJ. Schlegelberger had been teaching in the Faculty of Law at the University of Berlin as an honorary professor since 1922. On 10 October 1931 Schlegelberger was appointed State Secretary in the Reich Ministry of Justice under Justice Minister Franz Gürtner and kept this job until Gürtner's death in 1941. He was also made a member of the Academy for German Law and was the chairman of its Committee for Water Rights. He published numerous works, particularly on corporate law, many of which were largely aligned with National Socialist ideology. On 30 January 1938 Schlegelberger joined the Nazi Party on Adolf Hitler's orders.

== In the Nazi Party ==
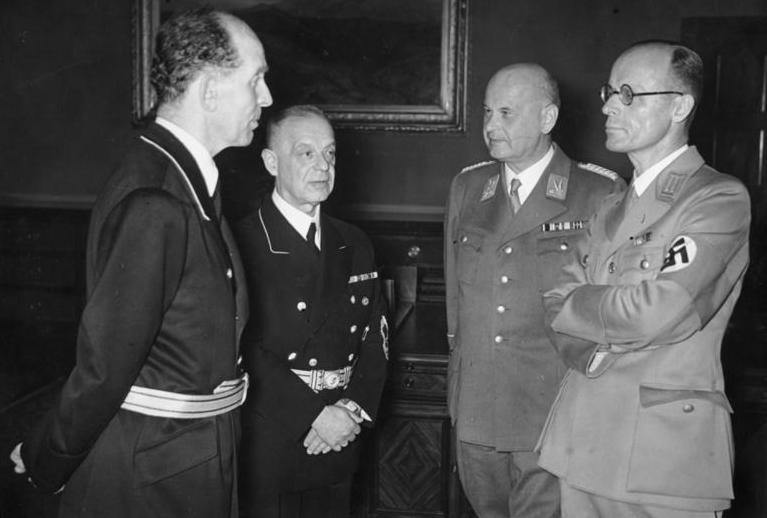
A meeting of four Nazis who bore much of the responsibility for allowing the legal system of Germany to be taken over by Nazi ideology. Franz Schlegelberger is second from left. On the far left in this image is Roland Freisler. Otto Thierack is the second from the right, and Curt Rothenberger is on the far right.

Among Schlegelberger's many works in this time was a bill for the introduction of a new national currency which was supposed to end the hyperinflation to which the Reichsmark was prone. After Franz Gürtner's death in 1941, Schlegelberger became provisional Reich Minister of Justice for the years 1941 and 1942, followed then by Otto Thierack. During his time in office the number of death sentences rose sharply. He authored the bills such as the so-called Poland Penal Law Provision (Polenstrafrechtsverordnung) under which Poles were executed for tearing down German posters. Schlegelberger's attitude towards his job may be best encapsulated in a letter to Reich Minister and Chief of the Reich Chancellery Hans Lammers:

Dear Reich Minister Dr. Lammers,

Upon the Führer-order of 24 October 1941 forwarded to me through Mr. State Minister and Chief of the Führer's and Reich Chancellor's Presidial Chancellery, I have handed the Jew Markus Luftglass, sentenced to 2½ years in prison by the Special Court in Katowice, over to the Gestapo for execution.

Heil Hitler!
Your
most obedient

— Schlegelberger

However, in a letter to Lammers dated 5 April 1942, Schlegelberger suggested some half-Jews be "spared" and given the choice between "evacuation" or sterilization:

The measures for the final solution of the Jewish question should extend only to full Jews and descendants of mixed marriages of the first degree, but should not apply to descendants of mixed marriages of the second degree.

With regard to the treatment of Jewish descendants of mixed marriages of the first degree, I agree with the conception of the Reich Minister of the Interior which he expressed in his letter of 16 February 1942, to the effect that the prevention of propagation of these descendants of mixed marriages is to be preferred to their being thrown in with the Jews and evacuated. It follows therefrom that the evacuation of those half-Jews who are no more capable of propagation is obviated from the beginning. There is no national interest in dissolving the marriage between such half-Jews and a full-blooded German.

Those half-Jews who are capable of propagation should be given the choice to submit to sterilization or to be evacuated in the same manner as Jews.

Upon his retirement from the position on 20 August 1942, Hitler gave Schlegelberger an endowment of RM 100,000; in 1944, Hitler allowed him to buy an estate with the money, something that only agricultural experts were entitled to under the rules in force at the time. This would later weigh against him at Nuremberg, for it showed that Hitler thought highly of Schlegelberger.

== After the war ==
At the Nuremberg Judges' Trial Schlegelberger was one of the main accused. He was sentenced to life in prison for conspiracy to perpetrate war crimes and crimes against humanity.

In the reasons given for the judgment, it says:

... that Schlegelberger supported the pretension of Hitler in his assumption of power to deal with life and death in disregard of even the pretense of judicial process. By his exhortations and directives, Schlegelberger contributed to the destruction of judicial independence. It was his signature on the decree of 7 February 1942 which imposed upon the Ministry of Justice and the courts the burden of the prosecution, trial, and disposal of the victims of Hitler's Night and Fog. For this he must be charged with primary responsibility. He was guilty of instituting and supporting procedures for the wholesale persecution of Jews and Poles. Concerning Jews, his ideas were less brutal than those of his associates, but they can scarcely be called humane. When the "final solution of the Jewish question" was under discussion, the question arose as to the disposition of half-Jews. The deportation of full Jews to the East was then in full swing throughout Germany. Schlegelberger was unwilling to extend the system to half-Jews.

— Nuremberg, UMKC.

At the end of the 1945–1947 trials Schlegelberger was sentenced to life in 1947, although in 1950 the 74-year-old Schlegelberger was released owing to incapacity. For years afterward, he drew a monthly pension of DM 2,894 (for comparison, the average monthly income in Germany at that time was DM 535). Schlegelberger then lived in Flensburg until his death on 14 December 1970.

== In popular culture ==
While a relatively obscure character in the regime, Schlegelberger – and particularly his role in the establishment of the Nazi order – is widely considered the inspiration for the character Ernst Janning, prime defendant in the 1961 movie Judgment at Nuremberg, played by Burt Lancaster.

== Bibliography ==
- Das Landarbeiterrecht. Darstellung des privaten und öffentlichen Rechts der Landarbeiter in Preußen, Berlin., C. Heymann 1907.
- Kriegsbuch. Die Kriegsgesetze mit der amtlichen Begründung und der gesamten Rechtsprechung und Rechtslehre -Berlin, Vahlen 1918 (with Georg Güthe)
- Freiwillige Gerichtsbarkeit, Heft 43, Berlin 1935 Industrieverlag Spaeth & Linde
- Gesetz über die Aufwertung von Hypotheken und anderen Ansprüchen vom 16. Juli 1925, Berlin, Dahlen, 1925. (co-author: Rudolf Harmening)
- Zur Rationalisierung der Gesetzgebung., Berlin, Vlg. Franz Vahlen, 1928
- Jahrbuch des Deutschen Rechtes., with Leo Sternberg, 26th volume, report about the year 1927, Vahlen, Berlin, 1928
- Das Recht der Neuzeit. Ein Führer durch das geltende Recht des Reichs und Preußens seit 1914 with Werner Hoche, Berlin: Franz Vahlen 1932.
- Rechtsvergleichendes Handwörterbuch für das Zivil- und Handelsrecht des In- und Auslandes – 4. Bd.: Gütergemeinschaft auf Todesfall – Kindschaftsrecht, Berlin Franz Vahlen, 1933
- Die Zinssenkung nach der Verordnung des Reichspräsidenten vom 8. Dezember 1931, with an introduction and brief comments by Dr. Dr. F. Schlegelberger, State Secretary in the Reich Justice Ministry, Franz von Dahlen, Berlin 1932
- Das Recht der Neuzeit. Vom Weltkrieg zum nationalsozialistischen Staat. Ein Führer durch das geltende Recht des Reichs und Preußens von 1914 bis 1934., Berlin: Franz Vahlen 1934.
- Die Erneuerung des deutschen Aktienrechts, Vortrag gehalten am 15. August 1935 vor der Industrie- und Handelskammer in Hamburg, Verlag Franz Vahlen, 1935
- Gesetz über die Angelegenheiten der freiwilligen Gerichtsbarkeit, Köln, Heymanns 1952.
- Das Recht der Gegenwart. Ein Führer durch das in Deutschland geltende Recht as publisher, Berlin and Frankfurt a. M., Franz Vahlen Verlag 1955
  - Das Recht der Gegenwart : ein Führer durch das in der Bundesrepublik Deutschland geltende Recht – 29. Aufl., Stand: 1 January 1998. – München : Vahlen, 1998 ISBN 3-8006-2260-2
- Seehandelsrecht. Zugleich Ergänzungsband zu Schlegelberger, Kommentar zum Handelsgesetzbuch, Berlin, Vahlen, 1959.(with Rudolf Liesecke)
- Kommentar zum Handelsgesetzbuch in der seit dem 1. Oktober 1937 geltenden Fassung (ohne Seerecht). Annotated by Ernst Geßler, Wolfgang Hefermehl, Wolfgang Hildebrandt, Georg Schröder, Berlin, Vahlen, 1960; 1965; 1966.
