= Judges' Trial =

Post-WWII war crimes trial

Coordinates: 49°27.2603′N 11°02.9103′E

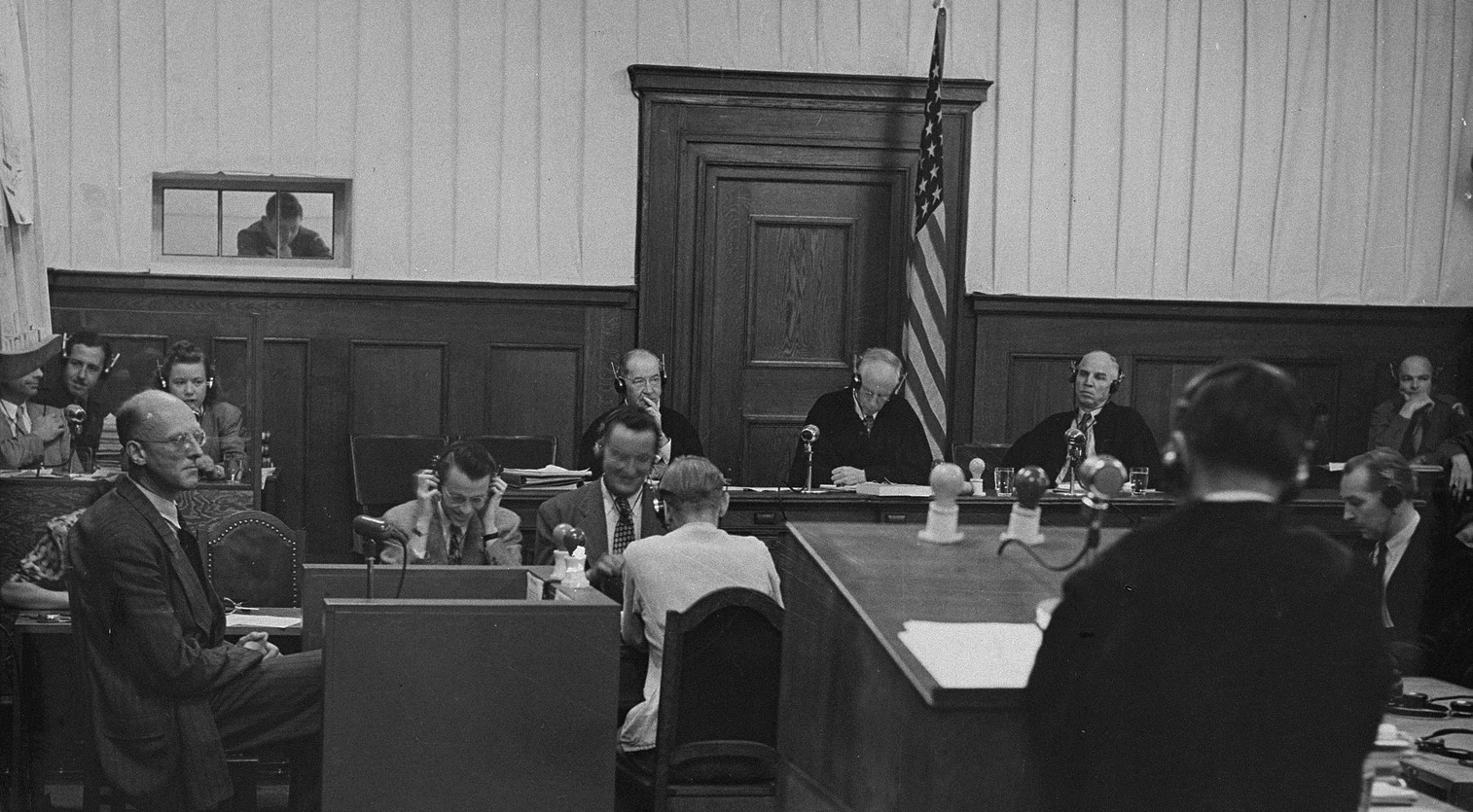
A witness testifies in the Judges' Trial

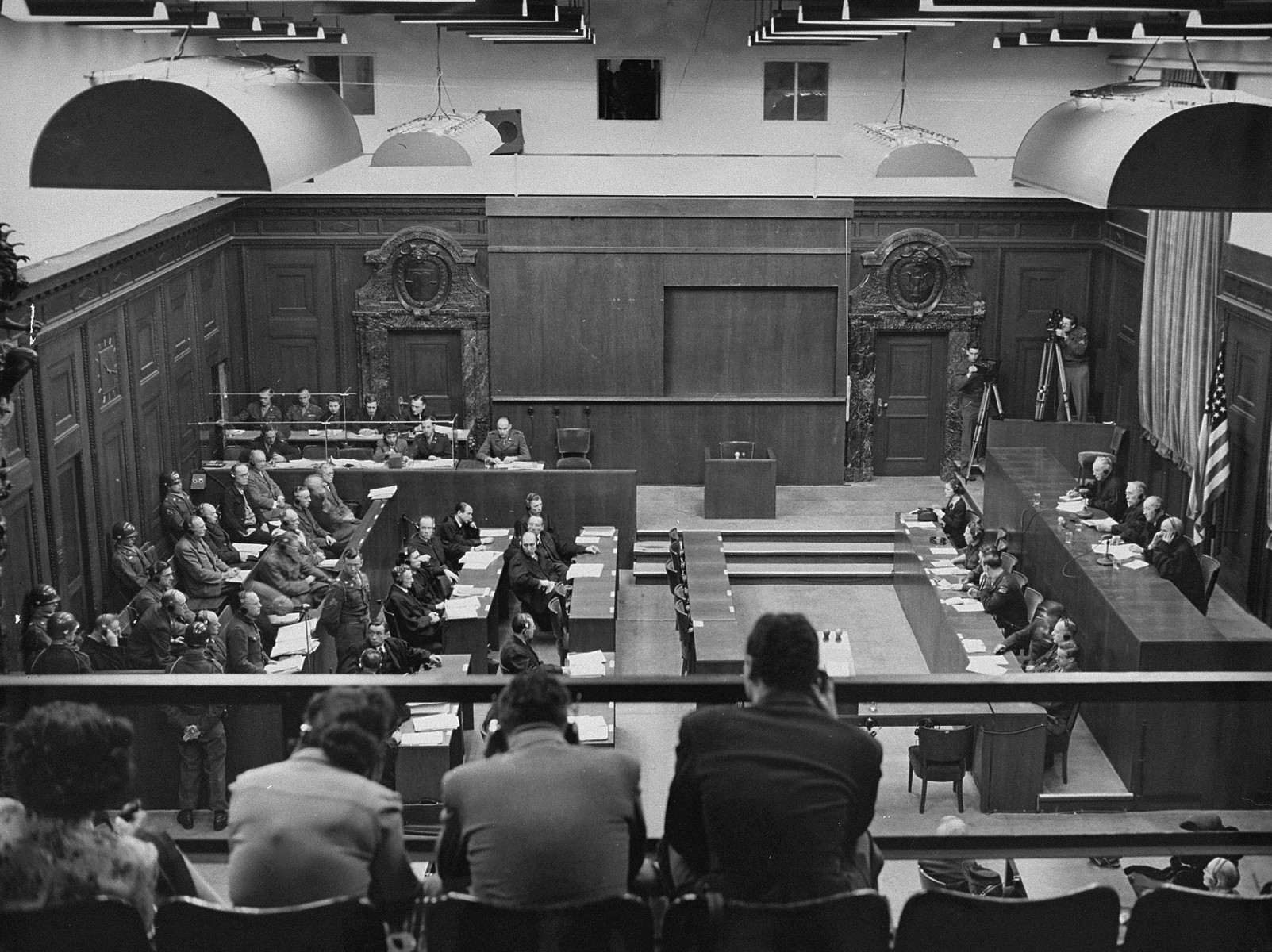
View of Judges' trial from visitors' gallery

The Judges' Trial (German: Juristenprozess; or, the Justice Trial, or, officially, The United States of America vs. Josef Altstötter, et al.) was the third of the 12 trials for war crimes the U.S. authorities held in their occupation zone in Germany in Nuremberg after the end of World War II. These twelve trials were all held before U.S. military courts, not before the International Military Tribunal, but took place in the same rooms at the Palace of Justice. The twelve U.S. trials are collectively known as the "Subsequent Nuremberg Trials" or, more formally, as the "Trials of War Criminals before the Nuremberg Military Tribunals" (NMT).

The defendants in this case were 16 German jurists and lawyers. Nine had been officials of the Reich Ministry of Justice, the others were prosecutors and judges of the Special Courts and People's Courts of Nazi Germany. They were—among other charges—held responsible for implementing and furthering the Nazi "racial purity" program through the eugenic and racial laws.

The judges in this case, held in Military Tribunal III, were Carrington T. Marshall (presiding judge), former Chief Justice of the Supreme Court of Ohio; James T. Brand, Associate Justice of the Supreme Court of Oregon; Mallory B. Blair, formerly judge of the Third Court of Appeals of Texas; and Justin Woodward Harding of the Bar of the State of Ohio as an alternate judge. Marshall had to retire because of illness on June 19, 1947, at which point Brand became president and Harding a full member of the tribunal. The Chief of Counsel for the Prosecution was Telford Taylor; his deputy was Charles M. La Follette. The indictment was presented on January 4, 1947; the trial lasted from March 5 to December 4, 1947. Ten of the defendants were found guilty; four received sentences of lifetime imprisonment (all four were released by 1957), and six received prison sentences of varying lengths (five, seven or 10 years; all but one, who died in 1950, were released by 1951). Four persons were acquitted of all charges.

== Indictment ==
1. Participating in a common plan or conspiracy to commit war crimes and crimes against humanity;
2. War crimes through the abuse of the judicial and penal process, resulting in mass murder, torture, plunder of private property.
3. Crimes against humanity on the same grounds, including slave labor charges.
4. Membership in a criminal organization, the NSDAP or SS leadership corps.

Count 4 applied only to Altstötter, Cuhorst, Engert, Joel (with respect to the SS) and to Cuhorst, Oeschy, Nebelung, and Rothaug concerning the NSDAP leadership. Both organizations had been found criminal previously by the IMT.

Count 1 was dropped: the court declared the charge to be outside its jurisdiction. Judge Blair filed a dissenting opinion that stated that the court should have made a statement that the Military Tribunals of the NMT in fact did have jurisdiction over charges of "conspiracy to commit war crimes and crimes against humanity".

All defendants pleaded "not guilty".

== Defendants ==
Name	Image	Position	Outcome
Josef Altstötter		Chief of the civil law and procedure division of the Ministry of Justice	Acquitted on counts 2 and 3, 5 years, including time already served on count 4; released December 1949; died 1979 in Nuremberg
Paul Barnickel		Senior public prosecutor of the People's Court	Acquitted; died 1966 in Munich
Hermann Cuhorst		Chief justice of the Special Court	Acquitted; died 1991 in Kressbronn am Bodensee
Karl Engert		Chief of the penal administrative division in the Ministry of Justice	Mistrial declared due to illness; died 1951
Günther Joël		Legal advisor and chief prosecutor of the Ministry of Justice	10 years, released 1951; died 1978
Herbert Klemm		State Secretary in the Ministry of Justice	Life imprisonment; commuted to 20 years, released February 1957; Died July 1963 in Starnberg
Ernst Lautz		Chief Public Prosecutor of the People's Court	10 years; released January 1951; died 1979 in Lübeck
Wolfgang Mettgenberg		Representative of the criminal legislation and administration division of the Ministry of Justice	10 years; died in prison 1950
Günther Nebelung		Chief justice of the Fourth Senate, People's Court	Acquitted; died 1970 in Seesen
Rudolf Oeschey		Chief judge of the Special Court at Nuremberg	Life imprisonment; commuted to 20 years, released 1955; died September 12, 1980, in Neuss
Hans Petersen		Chief justice of the First Senate, People's Court	Acquitted; died in 1963
Oswald Rothaug		Senior public prosecutor of the People's Court; Chief Justice of the Special Court	Life imprisonment; commuted to 20 years; released December 1956; died 1967 in Cologne
Curt Rothenberger		President of the Court of Appeals in Hamburg from 1935 to 1942, later became State Secretary in the Ministry of Justice	7 years; released 1950; committed suicide in 1959 in Hamburg when his role in the war was publicised.
Franz Schlegelberger		State Secretary, later Acting Minister of Justice	Life imprisonment; released in 1951 for health reasons; died 1970 in Flensburg
Wilhelm von Ammon		Counsellor of criminal legislation and administration division in the Ministry of Justice	10 years; released January 31, 1951; died 1992
Karl Westphal		Counsellor, criminal legislation and administration in the Ministry of Justice	Committed suicide after the indictment

The highest-ranking officials of the Nazi judicial system could not be tried: Franz Gürtner, Minister of Justice, died in 1941; Otto Georg Thierack, Minister of Justice since 1942, had committed suicide, as had Reichsgericht President Erwin Bumke; Roland Freisler, the President of the People's Court since 1942, was killed in a 1945 bombing raid on Berlin; Günther Vollmer, the Gauführer of Nazi jurists, had been killed in 1945. One who was alive but not tried was Hans Globke, who played a significant role in drafting and interpreting the infamous Nuremberg Laws and worked at the Reich Ministry of the Interior for the duration of the war. After the war ended Globke served as Chief of Staff for Adenauer in the West German Government from 1953 to 1963. He was still under scrutiny for his involvement with the Nazi Party when in 1963 East Germany held a show trial where he was convicted in absentia of War Crimes and sentenced to life in prison. However, East German law was not recognized in West Germany where Globke lived, so he ended up not serving any time. He died at age 74 in February 1973 at his home in the city of Bonn.

All convicts were found guilty on all charges brought before them, except Rothaug, who was found guilty only on count 3 of the indictment, while he was found not guilty on counts 2 and 4. However, the court commented in its judgment that:

By his manner and methods he made his court an instrumentality of terror and won the fear and hatred of the population. From the evidence of his closest associates as well as his victims, we find that Oswald Rothaug represented in Germany the personification of the secret Nazi intrigue and cruelty. He was and is a sadistic and evil man. Under any civilized judicial system he could have been impeached and removed from office or convicted of malfeasance in office on account of the scheming malevolence with which he administered injustice.

The public considered the sentences generally too low. Most of the convicts were released already in the early 1950s; some (Lautz, Rothenberger, Schlegelberger) even received retirement pensions in West Germany. The guide to German law entitled Das Recht der Gegenwart was published under the name Franz Schlegelberger until 2009.

== In popular culture ==
The Judges' Trial was the inspiration for the 1959 teleplay Judgment at Nuremberg, and the 1961 movie adaptation, Judgment at Nuremberg, starring Spencer Tracy, Burt Lancaster, Richard Widmark, Marlene Dietrich, Maximilian Schell, Judy Garland, Montgomery Clift, Werner Klemperer and William Shatner.
