= Otto Eger =

German jurist and legal historian

- Born: Ernst Ludwig Theodor Otto Eger; 19 October 1877; Darmstadt, Hesse, Germany
- Died: 11 April 1949 (aged 71); Gießen, Hesse, American occupation zone
- Education: Gießen; Göttingen; Berlin
- Occupations: Jurist; University professor of jurisprudence and legal history Nationalist activist
- Employer: University of Gießen
- Political party: NSDAP
- Spouse: Margarete Zöppritz (1880-1971)
- Children: 1909: Sophie – who married Rudolf Stadelmann; 24 July 1911: Heinz; 25 October 1912: Helmut

Otto Eger (19 October 1877 – 11 April 1949) was a German jurist and legal historian. As a professor at the University of Giessen (and undertaking, more briefly, an eight-year professorship at Basel), during the first half of the twentieth century, he was an influential teacher of several generations of legal scholars. He served terms as University Rector at both institutions. A committed nationalist, he backed national socialism which, in his judgement, opened up opportunities for revanchists who still hoped to find ways to undo the destruction of the Bismarckian German state in 1918/1919. More than six decades after his death, Otto Eger remained a controversial figure due to his engagement with the Nazi régime.

== Life ==
=== Provenance and early years ===
Ernst Ludwig Theodor Otto Eger was born at Darmstadt. Gustav Eger (1827–1894), his father, was a professor of linguistics at the (slightly misleadingly named) Technical University of Darmstadt. Gustav Eger died in 1894 making Otto an orphan: his mother had already died two years earlier. Otto Eger's later upbringing was accordingly supervised by a guardian: his father had already taken care to make available the funds needed to complete the boy's education.

=== University ===
In 1895 Eger embarked on his university studies, attending the universities of Göttingen (one term), Berlin (one term) and, principally, Giessen, which is where he passed his level I qualification in jurisprudence. As a student he became a member of the student fraternity Akademische Gesellschaft Das Kloster. He then took a post with the Legal Preparation Service (juristischen Vorbereitungsdienst). He worked, in parallel, on his doctorate, which was supervised by Gerhard Alexander Leist, and which he received from the University of Giessen in 1899 or 1900. His dissertation concerned representation in property acquisition (Stellvertretung beim Eigentumserwerb).

=== Marriage and family ===
He remained in Giessen, according to his own records employed between 1903 and 1908 by the university as a faculty assistant. In 1905 he married Margarete Zöppritz (1880-1973), daughter of geographer Karl Zöppritz (1838-1885) and, through her mother, a granddaughter of chemist Heinrich Will (1812-1890). The marriage would be followed over time by the births of three recorded children. At the university he was able to pursue his researches in jurisprudence and, increasingly, in legal history.

=== Habitation, professorships and the war years ===
Under the influence of Ludwig Mitteis and of Leist, after 1905 his primary focus switched to some of the legal elements in papyrology. His widely commended work on Egyptian land registration in the Roman period (Ägyptische Grundbuchwesen in römischer Zeit) earned him his habilitation (under the supervision of Mitteis) in 1909 and, having been published in book form, remains relevant for researchers more than a century later. In 1910 Eger accepted a full professorship in Roman law at the University of Basel where he was elected dean of the jurisprudence faculty in 1911, and where he served, in 1914, as university rector. This was also a busy period for Margarete Eger: the couple's three children were born in 1909, 1911 and 1912. War broke out in July 1914. As a reserve officer in the Imperial Army, Eger broke off his academic career to take part in the fighting. It was probably in the summer of 1914 that he received and turned down an invitation to accept an academic post at Prague University, although sources indicate that he took the opportunity to invoke the offer in the context of salary negotiations in Basel.

After suffering serious wounds, he was sent back from the frontline, deemed unfit to serve; in 1916 he returned to Basel and resumed his teaching career. In September 1917, however, he received an offer from his alma mater, which in April 1918 he accepted. He remained at Giessen for the rest of his career, in 1920 rejecting a further serious offer, this time from the University of Königsberg. During the so-called Weimar years he served twice as university rector, in 1923–24 and again in 1930–31.

=== Weimar years ===
War ended in military defeat for Germany in November 1918 and was followed by a succession of revolutions in the ports and cities. With this politically troubled backdrop, the University of Giessen faced difficult times socially and economically. Eger struggled to improve the situation by promoting academic self-government. In 1921 he became the first chairman of the newly formed Gießener Studentenhilfe e.V. (Gießen student support) organisation, in response to the urgent needs of the times. In 1929 work started on a new accommodation building in the Leihgesterner Weg which was opened to students in 1931, and continues in use complete with a cafeteria: it was later named the Otto Egger Hall of Residence (Otto Eger Heim), though more recently, as Otto Eger's political record has been re-evaluated, pressure has grown for a reversal of the naming decision.

During the turbulent postwar years Eger's academic work became, for him, a lesser priority than his administrative responsibilities at the university and, equally notable in retrospect, his political activities. Contemporary legal challenges now took precedence over Roman law. That was apparent both from the speeches he delivered as university rector and the way in which his time was taken up with organisation and mediation rather than research work. For the new republican government his position as a resolutely unreformed nationalist placed him firmly beyond the pale. Shortly after the end of the war he set up a company of "temporary volunteers" in Gießen, recruited from the ranks of disillusioned front-line survivors, now otherwise unemployed. The group planned to participate in the 1920 Kapp Putsch. The government's rapid suppression of the Putsch made this impossible, but it had served to highlight and intensify the political polarisation between traditionalists who saw the new republican government as a foreign imposition, and the large numbers of left wingers from the working and intellectual classes who thought that Germany's best hope now lay with a rerun, on Germany soil, of the still rapidly unfolding October Revolution in the Soviet Union.

The appearance in Gießen of a company of "temporary volunteers" was part of a national phenomenon, with quasi-military Free Corps (Freikorps) units appearing across the country, manned by former members of the defeated Imperial Army, often set up and led by "traditionalist" former army officers. They varied greatly in terms of organisational effectiveness, but they were united in their loathing of Germany's republican democratic government and in their fear of the spectre of Communism on the eastern horizon. Half an hour (by train) to the north was another university city with its own company of "temporary volunteers", made up of former soldiers, many of whom were now enrolled as university students. Marburg, like Gießen, would have been viewed before the war as a moderate conservative university city—bourgeois in character, in the term then-applied by commentators. The paramilitary volunteer corps in Marburg had much in common with the one headed up by Otto Eger in Gießen. In March 1920 the Marburg volunteers became infamous because of their involvement, it was said, in the murder of 15 workers in the village of Mechterstädt. The precise facts of the so-called Murders of Mechterstädt, which took place in the context of political strikes and street fighting, would remain contested. For Otto Eger the incident provided an opportunity to provide practical support to the Marburg volunteers in their time of trouble.

"In his capacity as leader of the Gießen student volunteers' corps", (Note: "In meiner Eigen-schaft als Führer der Zeitfreiwilligenkompagnie der Gießener Studen-tenschaft erlaube ich mir folgende Bitte an Ew. Magnifizenz zu richten...") he addressed a carefully crafted and detailed letter to the rector at Marburg University, urging the university to provide support to its students caught up in the affair. Later he had at least one face-to-face meeting with the Marburg rector to press his point. As a lawyer he urged that all the false reports that would no doubt be dredged up in court proceedings by the workers' lawyers must be very precisely refuted. For many years following the violence of the early 1920s, Otto Eger made himself available as the local contact man for the "persecuted putschists" who had been members of the disbanded (in 1921) Escherich Organisation. He used the speech opportunities which his rectorship provided to deliver what unsupportive sources identify as "revanchist propaganda".

=== Hitler years ===
For someone with Eger's political background, the power seizure by the National Socialists presented an opportunity. During the first three months of 1933 the new government rapidly transformed the German Republic into a one–party dictatorship. Through his involvement in politically conservative institutions Eger transferred easily into broadly equivalent National Socialist organisations such as the National Socialist People's Welfare (Nationalsozialistische Volkswohlfahrt) organisation and the National Socialist Association of Legal Professionals (Nationalsozialistischer Rechtswahrerbund). In 1941, after a long period of hesitation, he also joined the party itself. Long before that, in the bourgeois and academic clubs and associations in which he had long been a familiar presence, he was presenting himself as a committed government backer. As an example, a speech he delivered in 1942 at the 150th anniversary celebration of the Gießen Concert Association (Gießener Konzertverein) was shot through with all the favoured phrases and slogans from the Ministry for Popular Enlightenment. Many of the doctoral dissertations on jurisprudence that Eger supervised between 1933 and 1945 were shamelessly supportive of the government's objectives and accompanying anti-justice approach to the law.

During the 1930s Eger also returned to his research work on legal history. In 1935 he also took over as head of the William G. Kerckhoff Foundation (William G. Kerckhoff-Stiftung—subsequently merged into the Max Planck Institute for Medical Research) in Bad Nauheim. However, from 1939 (when he was aged 63) Eger was frequently prevented from teaching by problems with his digestion (biliary disease).

The Second World War brought setbacks and personal tragedy. Otto and Margarete Eger's sons, Heinz and Hans, were killed in action in 1941 and 1944. At the University of Giessen, those teaching staff who had been removed on suspicion of unreliability were not replaced, and by 1944, when much of the fabric of the place was destroyed by bombing, there was already talk of closing down several of German's smaller universities, including Gießen.

=== Postwar years in the American occupation zone ===
After 1945 Otto Eger engaged intensely in university administration. His principal objective, in which he only partially succeeded, was to avoid the permanent closure of the badly degraded university by the US military administration. In May 1946 plans were made to receive students later in the year at the re-designated Justus Liebig Academy for Agriculture and Veterinary Medicine, but it would be only in 1957 that Giessen recovered its university status, offering again a broad range of academic disciplines. By that time Otto Eger had long since died aged 71, following a long illness, in 1949.

== Evaluations ==
During the decade following his death Eger's attitudes and activities in respect of the National Socialists were obscured. An obituary provided by his former pupil Friedrich Weber included the simple statement that "developments at the German universities from 1933 caused him to withdraw more and more from his university roles, and to focus on teaching students", making no further mention of Eger's actions during the Hitler years. (Note: "Die Entwicklung an den deutschen Universitäten seit 1933 veranlaßte ihn, sich immer mehr von seinen Stellungen in der Universität und im Studentenwerk zurückzuziehen.") His entry in the Neue Deutsche Biographie, also written by Friedrich Weber, and published in 1959, barely mentions the final sixteen years of Eger's life. Max Kaser, in an affectionate obituary, also invites his readers to infer that Eger had distanced himself from the Hitler government. That implication takes no account of Eger's pro-government utterances, however, nor of the support for National Socialist philosophy that is disclosed in so many of the doctoral dissertations that he supervised. A number of more recent sources have sought to present a more inclusive view of Otto Eger.

By 1989 the re-evaluation of Eger's reputation had led to moves to rename the Otto Egger Hall of Residence (Otto-Eger-Heim). A student working group in respect of the matter was in place from 2009 to 2012. The Gießener Studentenhilfe e.V. of which Otto Eger served as the first chairman in 1921 had subsequently been relaunched as Studentenwerks Gießen and retained responsibility for the building: in 2015 the organisation's ruling council finally agreed to rename the Otto Egger Hall of Residence, which now became the Mildred Harnack-Fish House (Mildred-Harnack-Fish-Haus), honouring Mildred Harnack, an American-German resistance fighter executed in February 1943.

== Output (selection) ==
- Vertretung beim Eigentumserwerb an beweglichen Sachen. Gießen 1900 (Dissertation)
- Zum ägyptischen Grundbuchwesen in römischer Zeit. Leipzig/Berlin 1909 (Habilitations script). Nachdruck Aalen 1966
- Rechtsgeschichtliches zum Neuen Testament. Basel 1919 (Speeches as university rector)
- Vom heutigen und künftigen deutschen bürgerlichen Recht. Gießen 1923 (Speeches as university rector)
- Recht und Wirtschaftsmacht. Gießen 1931
- Das Recht der deutschen Kartelle. Berlin 1932
- Bericht über die 1. öffentliche Kerckhoff-Vorlesung der William G. Kerckhoff-Stiftung am 23. Juli 1935 im Kerckhoff-Institut zu Bad Nauheim. Bad Nauheim 1935
