= Herbert Klemm =

German lawyer and civil servant (1903–1963)

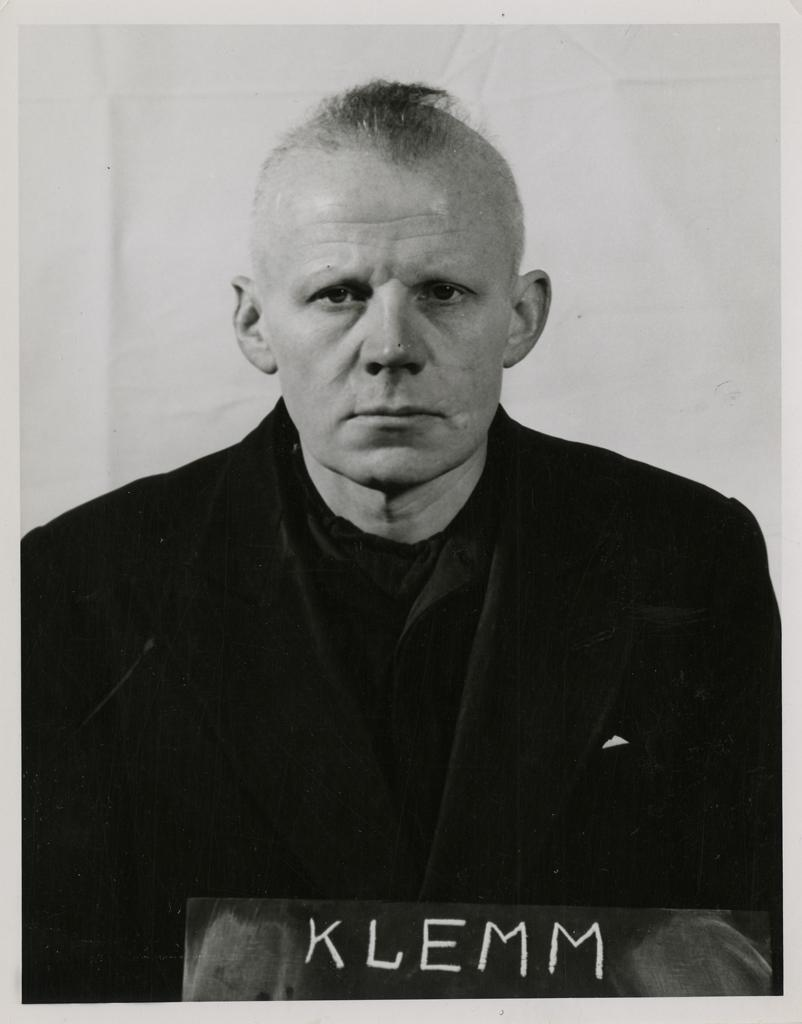
- Klemm during the Judges' Trial in 1947

Acting Reichsminister of Justice
- In office 5 May 1945 – 23 May 1945
- Preceded by: Otto Georg Thierack
- Succeeded by: Position abolished

State Secretary Reich Ministry of Justice
- In office 4 January 1944 – 23 May 1945
- Preceded by: Curt Rothenberger
- Succeeded by: Position abolished

Personal details
- Born: 15 May 1903 Leipzig, Kingdom of Saxony, German Empire
- Died: 4 July 1963 (aged 60) Starnberg, Bavaria, West Germany
- Party: Nazi Party
- Occupation: Lawyer
- Awards: Golden Party Badge

Herbert Klemm (15 May 1903 – 4 July 1963) was a German lawyer and SA-Oberführer who was a protégé of high-ranking Nazi officials Martin Bormann and Otto Thierack. He rose through the Nazi Party and government ranks to become the State Secretary in the Reich Ministry of Justice in Nazi Germany. He also served in the short-lived Flensburg government in May 1945 as the acting Reichsminister for Justice. He was tried, convicted and sentenced to life imprisonment for war crimes and crimes against humanity in the Judges' Trial at Nuremberg in 1947. His sentence was commuted and he was released in 1957.

== Early legal and SA career ==
Klemm was born in Leipzig and studied law. He passed the Referendar examination in 1925, completed a legal clerkship, passed the Assessor examination in 1929 and then worked for the public prosecutor's office in Dresden until 1935. On 1 January 1931, he joined the Nazi Party (membership number 405,576). On 30 June 1933, he joined the SA, the Party's paramilitary organization, where he eventually attained the rank of SA-Oberführer. His SA assignments included being the legal advisor for the SA in the state of Saxony, as well as serving as the SA liaison officer to the Saxon Minister of Justice. From 1935, he was the legal advisor to the SA-Stabschef, Viktor Lutze, and served as his liaison officer to the Reich Minister of Justice, Franz Gürtner.

== Government and Party posts ==
From March 1933 through March 1935, Klemm was employed at the Ministry of Justice in the state of Saxony as the personal advisor and adjutant to the Saxon Minister of Justice, Otto Thierack. He was also from March 1933 a public prosecutor in Saxony and, from May 1934, he held the office of Chief Public Prosecutor. When all the state justice ministries were centralized in April 1935, he was transferred to the Reich Ministry of Justice in Berlin and was promoted to the rank of Ministerialrat (Ministerial Councilor) on 20 April 1939. In July 1940, after the conquest of the Netherlands, Klemm was assigned to the Reichskommissariat Niederlande under Arthur Seyss-Inquart, where he dealt with the administration of German civil law and served as a liaison between the German administration and the Dutch Ministry of Justice in The Hague.

Klemm was friends with Martin Bormann, who was the chief of staff to Deputy Führer Rudolf Hess at the Munich headquarters of the Nazi Party. On 17 March 1941, Klemm secured an appointment to this office as the head of Department III-C, which dealt with reviewing laws and ordinances proposed by the Ministry of Justice. In 1943, he was awarded the Golden Party Badge, which was conferred on him by Bormann, now the chief of the Nazi Party Chancellery. On 4 January 1944, Klemm succeeded Curt Rothenberger as the State Secretary in the Reich Justice Ministry, which was now headed by his former patron Thierack, as Reichsminister. In September 1944, Klemm also was appointed as the deputy head of the National Socialist Association of Legal Professionals, also headed by Thierack, and to which he had belonged since 1933. On 5 May 1945, when the cabinet of the so-called Flensburg government was formed by Leading Minister Lutz Schwerin von Krosigk, Thierack was dismissed and Klemm succeeded him as acting Reichsminister of Justice. Klemm was arrested by British occupation troops along with all of the Flensburg government on 23 May 1945.

== Post-war prosecution ==
In the subsequent Nuremberg Trials, Klemm was brought up on charges in the so-called Judges' Trial that opened on 5 March 1947 against 16 high-ranking judicial officials and judges of the Nazi regime. Charged with war crimes and crimes against humanity, he was described as "sadistic, evil and ruthless", was found guilty and was sentenced to life imprisonment by an American military tribunal on 4 December 1947. The verdict was based on the following offenses:

- routinely denying clemency requests for death sentences imposed against those abducted under the Nacht und Nebel decrees,
- denying the application of German juvenile criminal law to Poles, Jews and Romani people,
- recommending the registration of Dutch Jews and the confiscation of their property,
- inciting the lynching of captured Allied airmen by refusing to prosecute perpetrators, and
- approving the evacuation of the Sonnenburg concentration camp, during which over 800 prisoners were shot by the Gestapo.

Klemm's sentence was commuted to 20 years and, on 14 February 1957, he was released from Landsberg prison and settled in Bredeney, a borough of Essen. He died in Starnberg in July 1963.

== Sources ==
- Klee, Ernst (2007). Das Personenlexikon zum Dritten Reich. Wer war was vor und nach 1945. Frankfurt-am-Main: Fischer-Taschenbuch-Verlag. ISBN 978-3-596-16048-8.
- Herbert Klemm Trial Judgement
