= Bad Griesbach =

Bad Griesbach im Rottal
- Town
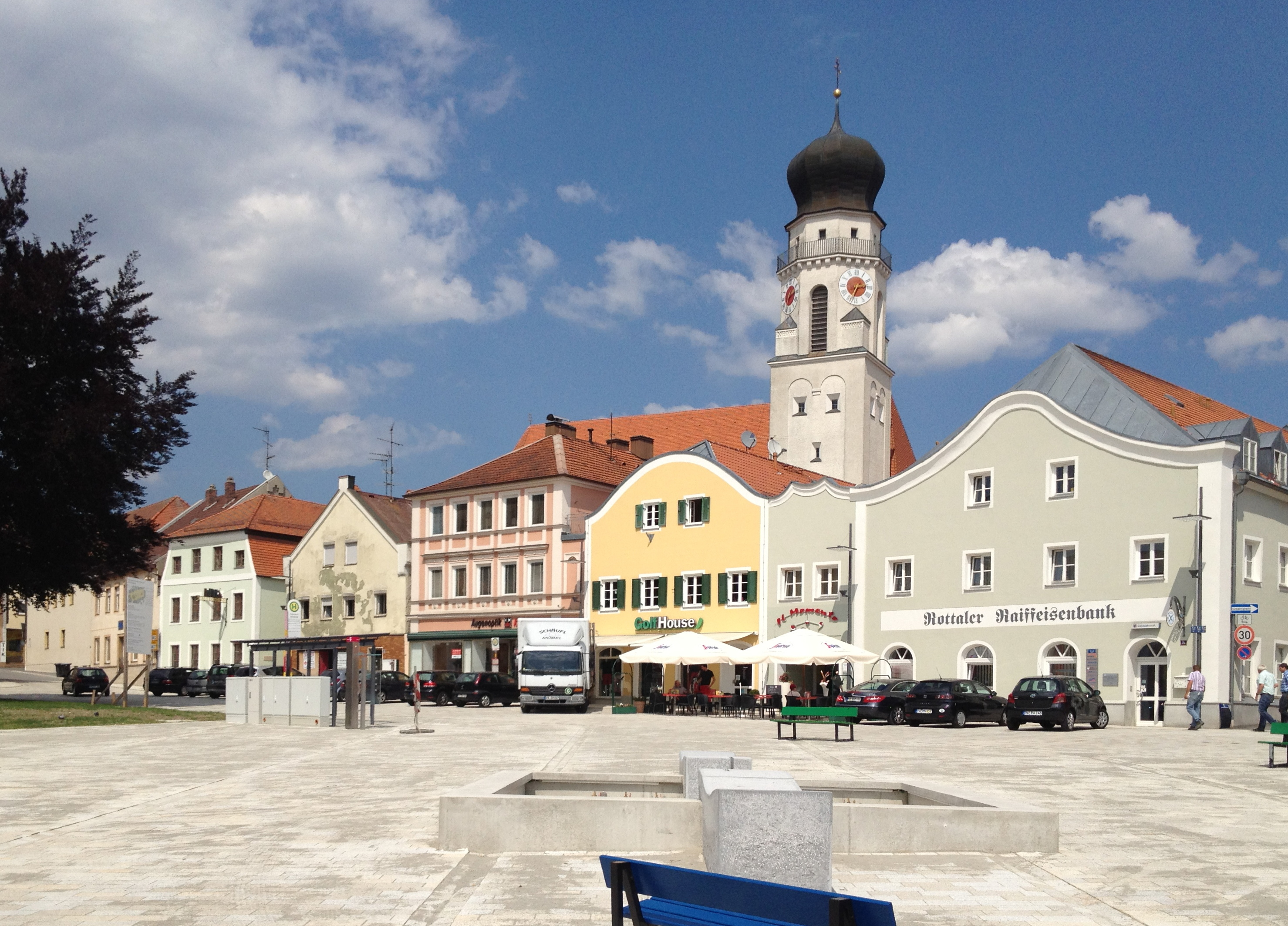
- Town square

- Coat of arms

- Location of Bad Griesbach im Rottal within Passau district
- Interactive map of Bad Griesbach im Rottal
- Location within Germany Location within Bavaria
- Coordinates: 48°27′N 13°12′E
- Country: Germany
- State: Bavaria
- Admin. region: Niederbayern
- District: Passau
- Subdivisions: 6 Ortsteile

Government
  - Mayor (2020–26): Jürgen Fundke

Area
  - Total: 70.13 km^{2} (27.08 sq mi)
- Elevation: 453 m (1,486 ft)

Population (2025-12-31)
  - Total: 9,050
  - Density: 129/km^{2} (334/sq mi)
- Time zone: UTC+01:00 (CET)
  - Summer (DST): UTC+02:00 (CEST)
- Postal codes: 94086
- Dialling codes: 08532
- Vehicle registration: PA
- Website: www.badgriesbach.de

Bad Griesbach im Rottal (German pronunciation: [baːt ˈɡʁiːsbax ʔɪm ˈʁɔtaːl], lit. 'Bad Griesbach in the Rott Valley'; Central Bavarian: Bod Griasboch (im Rottoi)), or just Bad Griesbach, is a town in the district of Passau in Bavaria in Germany.

== History ==
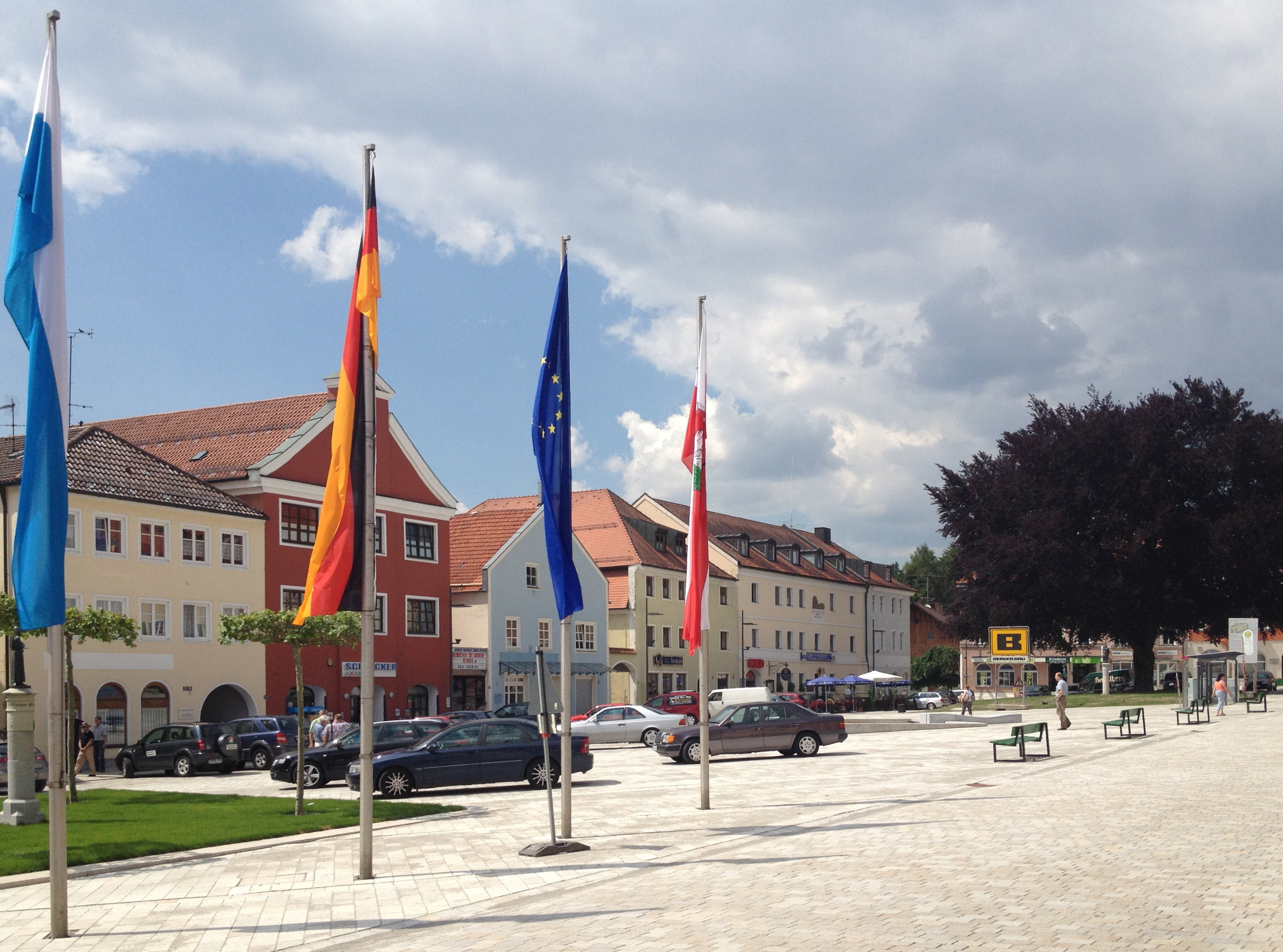
Town square

"Burg Griesbach" is first mentioned in a document from around 1076. The place was part of Landshut. It was raided and destroyed by an army from the Electorate of the Palatinate in 1504, only to be re-erected soon afterwards. In 1778/79 Griesbach was occupied by Austrian forces. As part of the Dukedom Bavaria, Griesbach im Rottal (official name) became more independent. In 1953 it was officially turned into a town (Kleinstadt).

The Bavarian reform of 1972 merged the municipalities of Karpfham, Parzham, Reutern, St. Salvator and Weng. The discovery of hot springs in 1972/73 lead to a new orientation as a spa town.

== Mayors ==
The mayor is Jürgen Fundke, he was elected in 2008 with 58% of the votes and re-elected in 2014 and 2020. He is the successor of Robert Erdl (CSU). The predecessors were Konrad Ebner (CSU) and Edmund Mitzam.

== Notable people ==
- The Holy Conrad of Parzham (born Johann Birndorfer) was born on December 22, 1818, in the hamlet Parzham, (died 1894), since 1977 Konrad is the patron saint of Bad Griesbach
- Josef Altstötter (1892-1979), lawyer, secretary of state in the ministry of justice and war criminal, was born in Griesbach
- Franz Beckenbauer (1945–2024), football player and manager, is, together with the bathroom pioneer Alois Hartl, since 2003 honorary citizen of Bad Griesbach.

== International relations ==
Bad Griesbach (Rottal) is twinned with:

- Friesach, Austria
