= Josef Altstötter =

German judge (1892–1979)

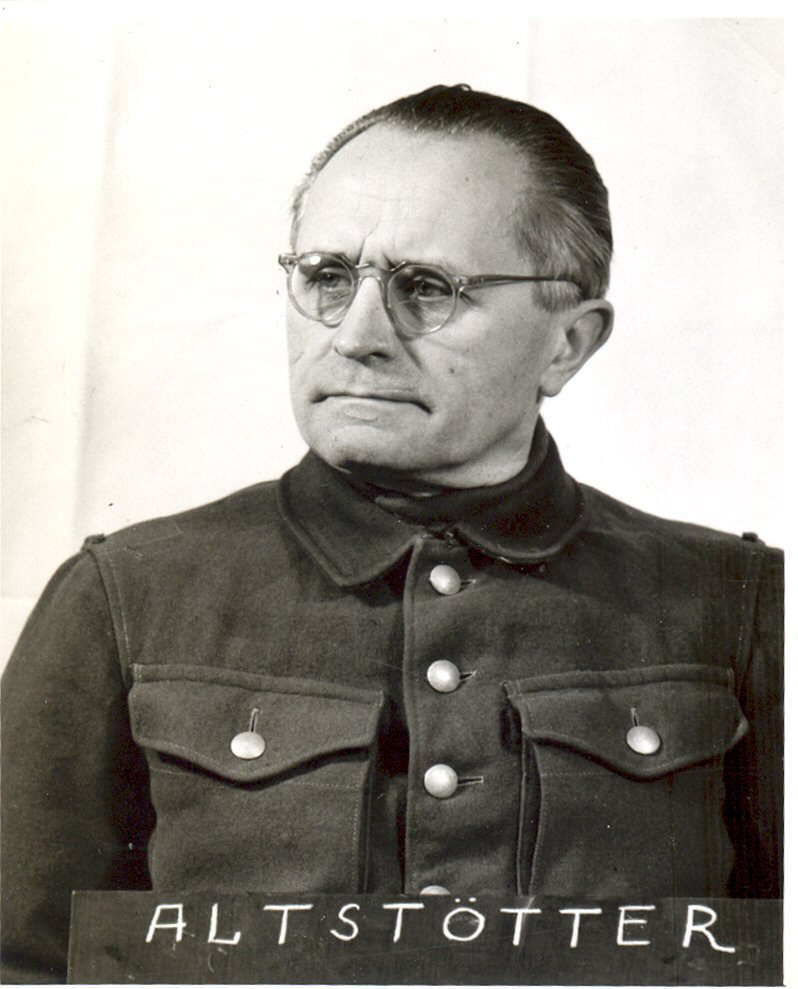
- Born: 4 January 1892; Bad Griesbach, German Empire
- Died: 13 November 1979 (aged 87); Nuremberg, Bavaria, West Germany
- Status: Deceased
- Conviction: Membership in a criminal organization
- Trial: Judges' Trial
- Penalty: 5 years imprisonment

Josef Altstötter (4 January 1892 – 13 November 1979) was a high-ranking official in the German Ministry of Justice under the Nazi Regime. Following World War II, he was tried by the Nuremberg Military Tribunal as a defendant in the Judges' Trial, where he was acquitted of the most serious charges, but was found guilty of a lesser charge of membership in a criminal organization (the SS).

== Professional career ==
After serving in World War I, Altstötter completed his law studies in Munich in 1920, passed the state jurisprudence examination and began work in 1921 as deputy judge in the Bavarian Justice Department. In 1927 he worked in the Reich Ministry of Justice. In 1933, he moved to the Supreme Court for Leipzig and finally in 1936 into Reich Labour Court.

From 1939 to 1942 he was with the Wehrmacht. From January 1943 he was back in the Reich Ministry of Justice (Division VI:Civil Law and Justice), where he was appointed in May 1943 chief of the civil law and procedure division ("Reichministerialdirektor"), and remained there throughout the Second World War. He was awarded the Golden Party Badge for service to the Nazi party.

Part of Altstötter's department included the Nuremberg racial laws enacted to isolate Jews from German life and deprive them of civil rights. His office also had responsibility for revising the German inheritance and family law. These revisions were to ensure that after death, the property of Jews would not go to their children, but instead would be forfeited to the German government.

== Membership in Nazi organizations ==
Prior to its takeover by the Nazi party Altstötter was a member of Der Stahlhelm, a right-wing veterans organisation. After this was restructured as a Nazi organization, Altstötter became a member of the SA (SA-number: Member 31). On 15 May 1937 Altstötter moved from the SA to the SS (membership number 289,254) in 1944 had reached the rank of SS-Oberführer (senior colonel). In September 1938 he also joined the Nazi Party (membership number 5,823,836). Josef Altstötter was friendly with high-level SS leaders with, among others, Heinrich Himmler, Ernst Kaltenbrunner and Gottlob Berger.

== After the war ==
In 1947, Josef Altstötter was one of the accused in the Judges' Trial. The indictment accused him, and other Nazi judges and legal officials of the participation in war crime and crimes against humanity. For Altstötter, the particular allegations against him were that he was criminally involved with both the Nazi racial laws and also with kidnapping and secret murder of people pursuant to the Nazi "Night and Fog Decree". However, there was only sufficient evidence to convict him of membership in the SS. According to the Tribunal, Altstötter

... was a member of the SS at the time of the pogroms in November 1938, "Crystal Week," in which the IMT found the SS to have had an important part. Surely whether or not he took a part in such activities or approved of them, he must have known of that part which was played by an organization of which he was an officer. As a lawyer he knew that in October of 1940 the SS was placed beyond reach of the law. As a lawyer he certainly knew that by the thirteenth amendment to the citizenship law the Jews were turned over to the police and so finally deprived of the scanty legal protection they had theretofore had. He also knew, for it was part of the same law, of the sinister provisions for the confiscation of property upon death of the Jewish owners, by the police. ... Conceding that the defendant did not know of the ultimate mass murders in the concentration camps and by the Einsatzgruppen, he knew the policies of the SS and, in part, its crimes. Nevertheless he accepted its insignia, its rank, its honors, and its contacts with the high figures of the Nazi regime. These were of no small significance in Nazi Germany. For that price he gave his name as a soldier and a jurist of note and so helped to cloak the shameful deeds of that organization from the eyes of the German people.

In December 1947, he was sentenced to five years in prison. Altstötter served his sentence at Landsberg Prison and was released on 21 December 1949 (several months early due to good behavior). From 1950 to 1966, he worked as a lawyer. In 1979, at the age of 87 years he died in Nuremberg.

== Awards ==
- German Cross in Gold on 25 March 1942 as Major d.B. in the II./Infanterie-Regiment 475

== See also ==
- Judges' Trial
