= Franz Gürtner =

German Minister of Justice (1881–1941)

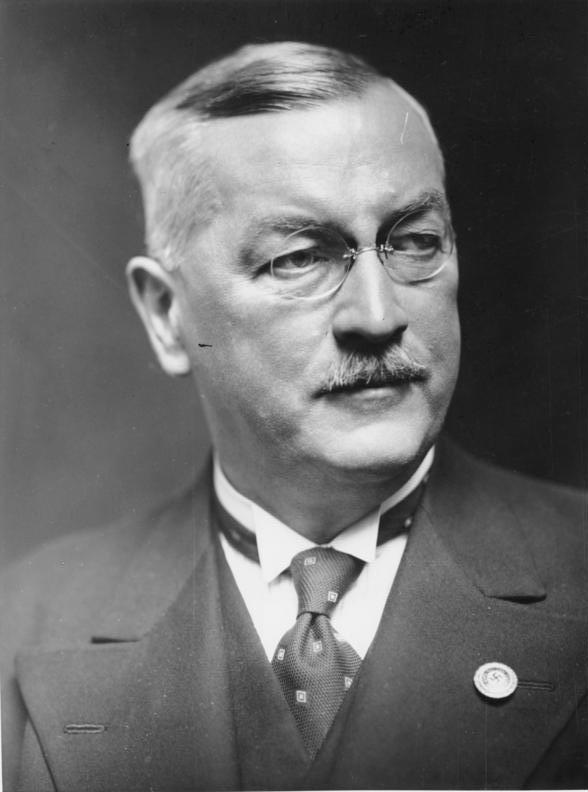
- Gürtner in 1938

Reich Minister of Justice
- In office 2 June 1932 – 29 January 1941
- President: Paul von Hindenburg (1932–1934); Adolf Hitler (1934–1941; as Führer)
- Chancellor: Franz von Papen (1932); Kurt von Schleicher (1932–1933); Adolf Hitler (1933–1941)
- Preceded by: Curt Joël
- Succeeded by: Franz Schlegelberger (acting)

Bavarian Minister of Justice
- In office 8 November 1922 – 6 June 1932
- Preceded by: Hugo Graf von und zu Lerchenfeld auf Köfering und Schönberg
- Succeeded by: Heinrich Spangenberger

Prussian Minister of Justice
- In office 17 June 1934 – 1 April 1935
- Preceded by: Hanns Kerrl
- Succeeded by: Position abolished

Personal details
- Born: 26 August 1881 Regensburg, Kingdom of Bavaria, German Empire
- Died: 29 January 1941 (aged 59) Berlin, Nazi Germany
- Party: German National People's Party (until 1933); National Socialist German Workers' Party (from 1937)
- Spouse: Luise Stoffel (m. 1920)
- Children: 3
- Education: Ludwig-Maximilians-Universität München
- Profession: Lawyer

Franz Gürtner (26 August 1881 – 29 January 1941) was a German Minister of Justice in the governments of Franz von Papen, Kurt von Schleicher and Adolf Hitler. Gürtner was responsible for coordinating jurisprudence in Nazi Germany and provided official sanction and legal grounds for a series of repressive actions under the Nazi regime from 1933 until his death in 1941.

== Biography ==
=== Early life and career ===
Gürtner was the son of Franz Gürtner (locomotive engineer) and Marie Gürtner, née Weinzierl. After graduating from the gymnasium in 1900 in Regensburg, he studied law at the Ludwig-Maximilians-Universität München. After eight semesters, he passed in 1904 his university examination. His preparation for Bavarian civil service was interrupted for the military service in the Königlich Bayerisches 11. Infanterie-Regiment "von der Tann". After passing his second Staatsexamen in 1908, he worked as syndic for a Munich brewery association. On 1 October 1909, he entered the higher civil service of the Bavarian ministry of justice. On 7 August 1914, Gürtner was drafted as a reserve officer for military service in First World War. He served with the 11th Infantry Regiment on the Western Front. He rose to deputy battalion commander and received the Iron Cross 1st and 2nd Class and the Military Merit Order (Bavaria) IV class with swords. From September 1917, he took part with the Bavarian Infantry Battalion 702 (with Asia Corps) in the campaign in Palestine region of the Ottoman Empire. Therefore, he received the House Order of Hohenzollern with swords and the Gallipoli Star. His appointment as battalion commander on 31 October 1918 was the day of the surrender of the Ottoman Empire. He led the battalion back to Constantinople (modern Istanbul, Turkey) and arrived on 17 March 1919 in Wilhelmshaven, where he was demobilized.

After the war, Gürtner pursued a successful legal career, being appointed Bavarian Minister of Justice on 8 November 1922, a position he held until 1932. Though a Roman Catholic, Gürtner joined the largely Protestant German National People's Party (Deutschnationale Volkspartei, DNVP), which was unusual as German Catholics usually supported the Centre Party or its Bavarian counterpart, the Bavarian People's Party. However, Gürtner was a staunch conservative and nationalist who rejected the Weimar Republic, as he associated democracy with "weakness", which led him into the radical conservative DNVP.

Gürtner's nationalist sympathies made him sympathetic to right-wing extremists such as Hitler. During the 1924 Beer Hall Putsch trial, Hitler was allowed to interrupt the proceedings as often as he wished, to cross-examine witnesses at will, and to speak on his own behalf at almost any length. Gürtner obtained Hitler's early release from Landsberg Prison, and later persuaded the Bavarian government to legalize the banned NSDAP, and allow Hitler to speak again in public.

=== Minister of Justice ===
On 2 June 1932, Gürtner was nominated as Reich Minister of Justice under Chancellor Franz von Papen. After serving in the cabinets of Papen and Kurt von Schleicher, Gürtner was retained by Hitler in his post, and made responsible for coordinating jurisprudence in Nazi Germany. Although Gürtner was not a Nazi, he shared the increasingly authoritarian bent of most of his DNVP colleagues. He fully supported the Reichstag Fire Decree, which effectively wiped out civil liberties in Germany. Indeed, on the day before the Reichstag fire, he proposed a bill that was almost as heavy-handed as the Reichstag Fire Decree; it would have instituted severe restrictions on civil liberties under the pretense of keeping the Communists from launching a general strike. He also merged the German judges' association with the new National Socialist Association of Legal Professionals (Nationalsozialistischer Rechtswahrerbund), and provided a veil of constitutional legality for the Nazi State.

At the end of June 1933, the DNVP was dissolved under pressure from the Nazis, and the DNVP Chairman Alfred Hugenberg resigned from the cabinet. However Gürtner, instead of resigning, elected to remain in the government as an independent. At first, Gürtner also tried to protect the independence of the judiciary and at least a facade of legal norms. He sought to curb the SA and SS' growing tendency to engage in extrajudicial punishments. Although no democrat, Gürtner believed in the rechtsstaat ("law state"), and sought to protect the turf of his ministry. He was most insistent that only the courts could inflict punishments on opponents of the Nazi regime. The ill-treatment of prisoners at concentration camps in Wuppertal (Kemna), Bredow and Hohnstein (in Saxony), under the jurisdiction of local SA leaders, provoked a sharp protest from the Ministry of Justice. Gürtner observed that prisoners were being beaten to the point of unconsciousness with whips and blunt instruments, commenting that such treatment

reveals a brutality and cruelty in the perpetrators which are totally alien to German sentiment and feeling. Such cruelty, reminiscent of oriental sadism cannot be explained or excused by militant bitterness however great.

On 2 October 1933, Gürtner was made a member of Hans Frank's Academy for German Law at its inaugural meeting. Also in 1933, Gürtner came into conflict with one of his subordinates in the Justice Ministry, Roland Freisler, over the issues of Rassenschande (literally: "racial disgrace"), or sexual relationship between an "Aryan" and a "non-Aryan", which Freisler wanted immediately criminalized. Gürtner, in a meeting, pointed out many practical difficulties with Freisler's proposal. This did not, however, stop the passage of the Nuremberg Laws two years later, criminalizing Rassenschande.

In June 1934, Gürtner succeeded Hanns Kerrl as Minister of Justice in Prussia in the cabinet of Hermann Göring, thus uniting in a dual mandate the highest positions in the administration of justice in the Reich and the largest German state. This portfolio also brought him an ex officio appointment to the Prussian State Council. In the weeks following the Night of the Long Knives (30 June 1934), a purge of SA officers and conservative critics of the regime that resulted in perhaps hundreds of executions, he demonstrated his loyalty to the Nazi regime by writing a law that added a legal veneer to the purge. Signed into law by both Hitler and Minister of the Interior Wilhelm Frick, the "Law Regarding Measures of State Self-Defense" retroactively legalized the murders committed during the purge. Gürtner even quashed some initial efforts by local prosecutors to take legal action against those who carried out the murders. As a part of bid to retain a role for the judiciary in the repression of enemies of the state and to protect the Rechtsstaat, Gürtner opened the first session of the People's Court on 14 July 1934. The People's Court was a special court for trying those accused of being enemies of the state, whose procedures were meant to ensure the conviction of the accused. Starting in 1933, Gürtner found himself uneasily attempting to maintain the rule of law in Germany by bending the rules of the laws to suit Hitler, a process that steadily involved him and the rest of the German judiciary into excusing and justifying terror.

From the beginning of the Nazi regime, Gürtner became involved in the Nazification process of the institutions of the state and society as it applied to the realm of legal jurisprudence, and he is even credited for coining the term for this process: Gleichschaltung. In a series of laws, first the individual state ministries of justice were eliminated in December 1934 and state judicial officials reported to Gürtner. The work culminated when the "Third Law to Transfer the Administration of Justice to the Reich" (24 January 1935) became effective on 1 April 1935. All justice authorities and officials in the sixteen German states were nationalized. This resulted in the Reich taking over 65,000 officials and 2,000 state offices. All state judicial revenues and expenditures were assumed by the Reich Ministry. The administration of justice was thus placed solely in the hands of one great, unified national department for the first time.

In July 1935, Gürtner amended Paragraph 175 of the German penal code to extend its scope and increased the penalties. By the end of 1935, it was already apparent that neither Gürtner nor Frick would be able to impose limitations on the power of the Gestapo, or control the SS camps where thousands of detainees were being held without judicial review. Instead of resigning, Gürtner again stayed on. To mark the fourth anniversary of the Nazi regime on 30 January 1937, Hitler determined to enroll all the remaining non-Nazi ministers in the Nazi Party and to confer personally upon them the Golden Party Badge. By his acceptance, Gürtner officially joined the Nazi Party.

During World War II, the feeble protestation of the Ministry of Justice was weakened still further, as alleged criminals were increasingly handled by the Gestapo and SS, without recourse to any court of law. Gürtner provided official sanction and legal grounds for a series of repressive actions, beginning with the institution of Ständegerichte (drumhead courts-martial) that tried Poles and Jews in the occupied eastern territories, and later for decrees that opened the way for implementing the Final Solution. A district judge and member of the Confessing Church, Lothar Kreyssig, wrote to Gürtner protesting (correctly) that the T4 program was illegal (since no law or formal decree from Hitler had authorised it). Gürtner promptly dismissed Kreyssig from his post, telling him, "If you cannot recognise the will of the Führer as a source of law, then you cannot remain a judge."

Gürtner died on 29 January 1941 in Berlin.

== See also ==
- Aktion T4
- Lothar Kreyssig
