= Fritz Rehn =

Fritz Rehn (3 August 1874 – 18 September 1934) was a German lawyer and the first Judge-President of the Nazi People's Court.

In 1901 he became an attorney. In 1905 he was appointed to the court in Bochum and in 1913 he moved to Koblenz. In 1920, he became a Regional Director and he moved to Berlin in 1933 to become chairman of the newly instituted Special Court on the District Court of Berlin. In July 1934 he was appointed president of the Senate Chamber.

With the opening of the People's Court on 1 July 1934 he was elected the Judge-President and he presided over its first sessions, but a few weeks after his appointment he died of a gall-bladder disease at only 60 years of age.

Legal offices
Preceded by Post Created	Judge President of the People's Court; 13 July – 18 September 1934	Succeeded by Otto Thierack
