= Academy for German Law =

Nazi legal organization

- Akademie für deutsches Recht
- Abbreviation: ADR
- Formation: 26 June 1933
- Dissolved: 8 May 1945
- Type: Public corporation
- Headquarters: Munich, Nazi Germany
- Members: 300
- Präsident: Hans Frank (1933–1942); Otto Georg Thierack (1942–1945)
- Parent organization: Reich Ministry of Justice; Reich Ministry of the Interior

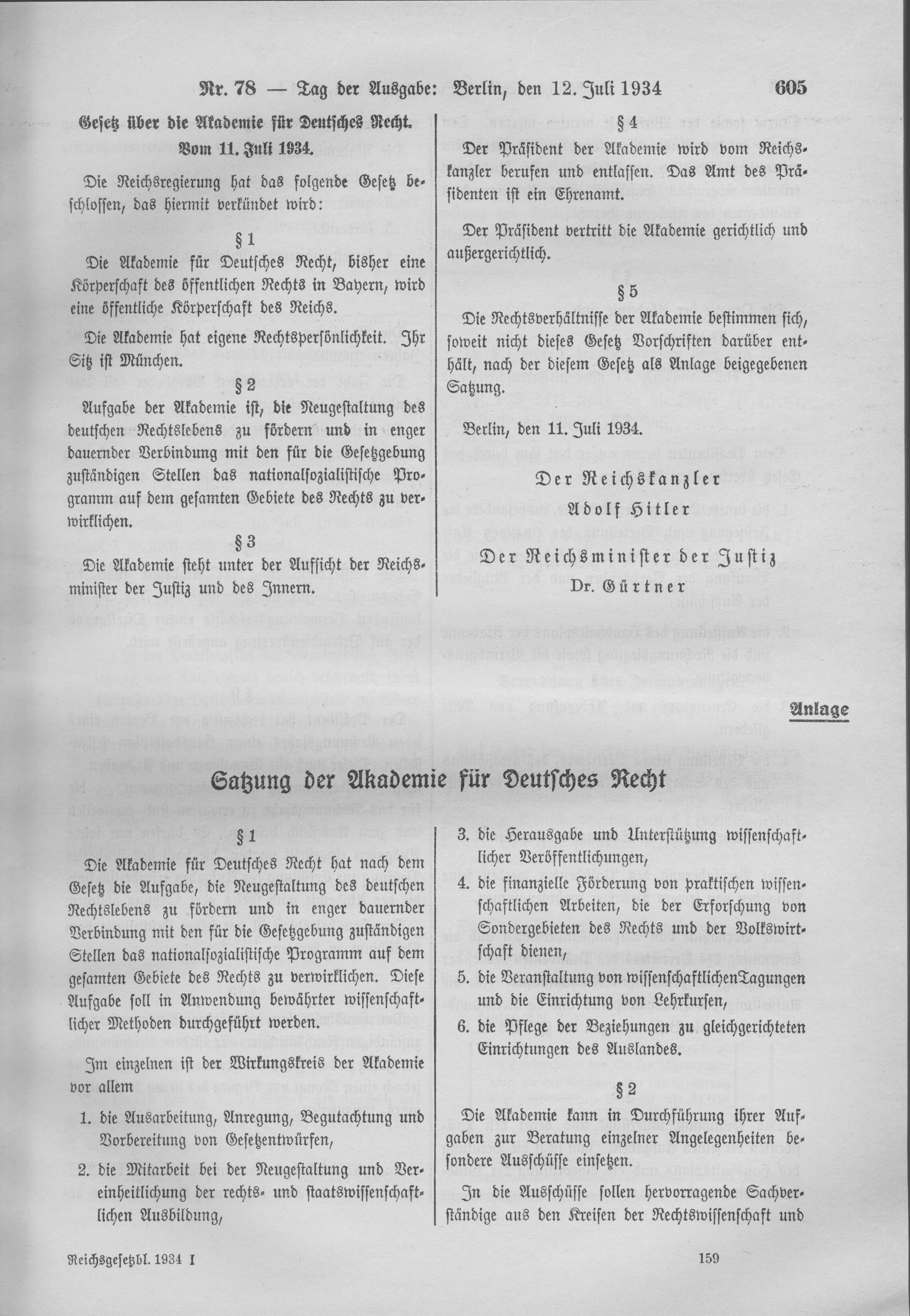
Page from the Reichsgesetzblatt announcing the 1934 law that founded the Akademie für deutsches Recht.

The Academy for German Law (German: Akademie für deutsches Recht) was an institute for legal research and reform founded on 26 June 1933 in Nazi Germany. After suspending its operations during the Second World War in August 1944, it was abolished after the fall of the Nazi regime on 8 May 1945.

== Origins ==
The academy was founded on the initiative of Hans Frank, the head of the Reich Legal Department (Reichsrechtabteilung) in the Nazi Party's national leadership (Reichsleitung) and, at the time, also the Bavarian Minister of Justice. It was originally established as a public corporation on 22 September 1933 by a Bavarian state law, and was subordinated to the Bavarian State Ministry of Justice. The inaugural meeting was held on 2 October 1933 in Leipzig at the "German Lawyers' Day" conference of the National Socialist Association of Legal Professionals, which Frank had headed since 1928. Frank next sought to expand the academy's scope to all of Germany. Subsequently, through enactment of a national law by the Reichstag on 11 July 1934, the academy became a public corporation of the Third Reich. It was jointly supervised by the Reich ministries of Justice and the Interior.

== Functions ==
The academy generally was charged with promoting reform of German legal life by working in liaison with legislative bodies to implement the Nazi program in the fields of law and economics. Among the academy's specific tasks were: (1) composition, initiation and preparation of draft laws, (2) rejuvenating and unifying training in jurisprudence and political science, (3) editing and supporting publications, (4) financing and assisting research work in law and political economy, (5) organizing conferences and training courses, and (6) cultivation of relations with similar institutions abroad.

== Organization and leadership ==
The academy was originally headed by a leiter at the head of a führerrat, or leadership council. In accordance with the provisions of the July 1934 law, on 9 August the chief executive was given the title of Präsident. He was assisted by a Vizepräsident and a präsidium, or standing executive committee, which oversaw and controlled Academy activities between plenary sessions. Apart from the two top executives, other ex officio members of the präsidium included the Treasurer, the Director of Legal and Policy Work, the Reich Justice and Interior Ministers and the head of the Reich Chancellery. The academy accomplished its work through numerous committees, that were assigned specific tasks such as Civil Law, Criminal Law, Police Law, Military Law, Philosophy of Law, etc.

=== Presidents ===
No.	Portrait	Name	Took office	Left office	Time in office
1	Hans Frank	Hans Frank (1900–1946)	9 August 1933	20 August 1942	9 years, 11 days
2	Otto Georg Thierack	Otto Georg Thierack (1889–1946)	20 August 1942	8 May 1945	2 years, 261 days

=== Vice-Presidents ===
No.	Portrait	Name	Took office	Left office	Time in office
1	Wilhelm Kisch [de]	Wilhelm Kisch (1874–1952)	1934	1937	2–3 years
2	Carl August Emge [de]	Carl August Emge (1886–1970)	1937	1942	4–5 years
3	Curt Rothenberger	Curt Rothenberger (1896–1959)	1942	1944	1–2 years

== Membership ==
The academy was limited to a membership not to exceed 300, and who were appointed for a four-year term. Its members were drawn from prominent representatives of law, politics, economics, academia and business. Noted academics included Martin Heidegger, Hans Carl Nipperdey, Carl Schmitt and Jakob Johann von Uexküll. Among prominent industrialists were Carl Bosch, Friedrich Flick and Fritz Thyssen. Among the high Nazi Party and government officials were Frank, Walter Buch, Wilhelm Frick, Joseph Goebbels, Hermann Göring, Rudolf Hess, Heinrich Himmler, Alfred Rosenberg, Julius Streicher, and Baldur von Schirach.

== Financing ==
In the first years of its existence, the academy was almost entirely funded by donations from third parties, the supporting members, which included both private individuals and business concerns. The Justice Ministry had made its approval of the 1934 transfer of the academy to the Reich dependent on it being able to fund itself, without imposing a financial burden on the Reich, the German States or the Party. In the year 1936, academy funding reached record donations of over one million Reichsmarks. However, donations began to fall off, especially after the start of the World War in 1939. In 1940, for the first time, a subsidy by the Reich government was needed to cover expenses, and by 1942 the academy was being entirely financed by the Reich. In a 9 July 1943 amendment to the academy statute, private donations and supporting memberships were banned, and the post of Treasurer was eliminated.

== Activities and dissolution ==
The academy was most active in the early years after its founding. Through its efforts at holding impressive international conferences, the academy scored propaganda victories that contributed to the reputation of the Third Reich. The academy held 7 annual conferences and some 15 plenary sessions between 1933 and 1940. Though officially headquartered in Munich, on 6 June 1935, the academy also acquired a house and property at Leipziger Platz 15 in Berlin where much of its administrative operations were housed. The foundation stone was laid for a new Haus des Deutschen Rechts (House of German Law) at Ludwigstrasse 28 in Munich on 24 October 1936, and the building officially opened on 13 May 1939. Construction on another nearby building was halted when the war began.

After Frank's appointment as Governor-General of occupied Poland in October 1939, his involvement with the academy diminished. Alarmed by the increase in extrajudicial killings and other police state tactics, Frank made a series of four speeches at the Austrian Academy of Sciences, the Friedrich Wilhelm University of Berlin, the Ludwig-Maximilians-Universität München, and Heidelberg University in June and July 1942 defending the existing German judicial system. Furious at this perceived disloyalty and the controversy it raised, Adolf Hitler forced Frank's resignation from the presidency of the Academy on 20 August 1942.

One of Frank's original goals for the academy — influencing Nazi legislation — was only partially successful because several ministerial bureaucracies successfully defended their prerogatives. Frank's successor, Minister of Justice Thierack, attempted to push on with Nazi reform of the German law code, but by now the war was consuming nearly all of Hitler's time and attention. The goal of completely replacing the existing German civil code with a new Volksgesetzbuch (People's Code), emphasizing the primacy of the state over the individual, was never fully realized. Apart from disagreements between the academy, the Justice Ministry and Hitler, the size and complexity of the operation hindered its feasibility, particularly after the onset of the war. Only a small segment of the code ultimately was revised.

Due to the worsening war situation and the need to release additional manpower for the war effort, the academy closed its Berlin offices in January 1944 and suspended all activities in August 1944. It was finally abolished after the fall of the Nazi regime in May 1945.

== Publications ==
- Jahrbuch der Akademie für deutsches Recht (Yearbook of the Academy for German Law)
- Zeitschrift der Akademie für deutsches Recht (Journal of the Academy for German Law) - monthly
- Deutsche Rechtswissenschaft (German Jurisprudence) - founded 1939, monthly
- Zeitschrift für Wehrrecht (Magazine for Military Law)
- Schriftenreihe der Akademie für deutsches Recht (Publications of the Academy for German Law)

== Bibliography ==
- Klee, Ernst (2007). Das Personenlexikon zum Dritten Reich. Wer war was vor und nach 1945. Frankfurt-am-Main: Fischer-Taschenbuch-Verlag. ISBN 978-3-596-16048-8.
- Miller, Michael D.; Schulz, Andreas (2015). Leaders of the Storm Troops. Vol. 1. Solihull, England: Helion & Company. ISBN 978-1-909982-87-1.
- Orlow, Dietrich (1973). The History of the Nazi Party: 1933-1945. University of Pittsburgh Press. ISBN 0-822-9-3253-9.
- Zentner, Christian; Bedürftig, Friedemann (1997). The Encyclopedia of the Third Reich. New York: Da Capo Press. ISBN 0-306-80793-9.
