= Volksgesetzbuch =

Civil law code project in Nazi Germany

The Volksgesetzbuch was the attempt of Third Reich jurists in the Academy for German Law to replace the Bürgerliche Gesetzbuch by a civil law code aligned with Nazi principles. The project was terminated in 1944 by Reich Minister of Justice and head of the Academy Otto Georg Thierack.
