= Dieter Medicus =

German jurist

- Born: 9 May 1929; Berlin-Steglitz, Germany
- Died: 6 June 2015 (aged 86); Munich, Germany
- Citizenship: German
- Scientific career
- Fields: Private law, Roman law, Ancient law, history of law
- Institutions: Heidelberg University
- Doctoral advisor: Max Kaser
- Doctoral students: Jens Petersen

Dieter Medicus (9 May 1929 – 6 June 2015) was a German jurist. Until his retirement in 1994, he was professor of Private Law and history of Ancient law at LMU Munich.

== Life ==
Medicus was born 1929 in Berlin. His father was a chemist. He studied law at the Humboldt University of Berlin, the University of Würzburg and the University of Münster. In 1954, he passed the first state exam (erstes juristisches Staatsexamen) and in 1957, the second state exam (zweites Staatsexamen)) in Münster. He was a doctoral student of Max Kaser (dissertation Zur Geschichte des Senatus consultum Velleianum—‘On the History of the Senatus Consultum Velleianium’ in 1956) and habilitated in 1962 (Id quod interest. Studien zum römischen Recht des Schadensersatzes—‘Id quod interest. Studies about the Roman law of damages’). In 1962, he was full professor at Kiel University, afterward at the University of Tübingen (1966) and the University of Regensburg (1969). From 1978 to 1994, he was full professor of Private Law and history of Ancient law at LMU Munich.

Medicus is author of the standard text book on German private Law (Bürgerliches Recht, 23rd edition 2011). Bürgerliches Recht was translated into Japanese (Doitsu-minpō, 1997) and hailed as “beacon of scholarly writing”. It is “well-known to every German lawyer” and even cited by courts. His book on the General Part of the German Civil Code (Allgemeiner Teil des Bürgerlichen Rechts) was translated into Chinese (De guo min fa zong lun, 2000). His text books on the law of obligations were translated into Spanish (tratado de las relaciones obligacionales, 1995). He was one of the advisors of the German Government during the reform of the law of obligations (Schuldrechtsreform) in 2002.

== Memberships and honours ==
Medicus was elected member of the Bavarian Academy of Sciences and Humanities (Class for History and Philosophy) in 1980. He was awarded a doctorate honoris causa by the University of Regensburg in 1999 and by Martin Luther University Halle-Wittenberg in 2008.

== Works ==
- Bürgerliches Recht. Eine nach Anspruchsgrundlagen geordnete Darstellung zur Examensvorbereitung. Carl Heymanns Verlag, Köln 1968. 29th edition (with Jens Petersen): Verlag Franz Vahlen, München 2014, ISBN 978-3800647378.
- Gesetzliche Schuldverhältnisse. Delikts- und Schadensrecht, Bereicherung, Geschäftsführung ohne Auftrag. Verlag C. H. Beck, München 1977, ISBN 3-406-06668-2. 5th edition: Verlag C. H. Beck, München 2007, ISBN 978-3-406-54445-3.
- Allgemeiner Teil des BGB. Ein Lehrbuch. C.F. Müller Verlag, Heidelberg 1982, ISBN 3-8114-5082-4. 10th edition: C.F. Müller Verlag, Heidelberg 2010, ISBN 978-3-8114-9652-1.
- Grundwissen zum bürgerlichen Recht. Ein Basisbuch zu den Anspruchsgrundlagen. Carl Heymanns Verlag, Köln 1994, ISBN 3-452-22312-4. 8th edition: Carl Heymanns Verlag, Köln 2008, ISBN 978-3-452-26878-5.
- Id quod interest – Studien zum römischen Recht des Schadensersatzes. Böhlau Verlag, Köln and Graz 1962.
