= Bürgerliches Gesetzbuch =

Civil code of Germany

The Bürgerliches Gesetzbuch (German: [ˈbʏʁɡɐlɪçəs ɡəˈzɛtsbuːx], lit. 'Civil Law Book'), abbreviated BGB, is the civil code of Germany, codifying most generally-applicably private law. In development since 1881, it became effective on 1 January 1900, and was considered a massive and groundbreaking project.

The BGB served as a template in several other civil law jurisdictions, including Japan, Korea, the Republic of China (Taiwan), Thailand, Brazil, Greece, Estonia, Latvia, and Ukraine. It also had a major influence on the 1907 Swiss Civil Code, the 1942 Italian Civil Code, the 1966 Portuguese Civil Code, and the 1992 reformed Dutch Civil Code.

== History ==
=== German Empire ===
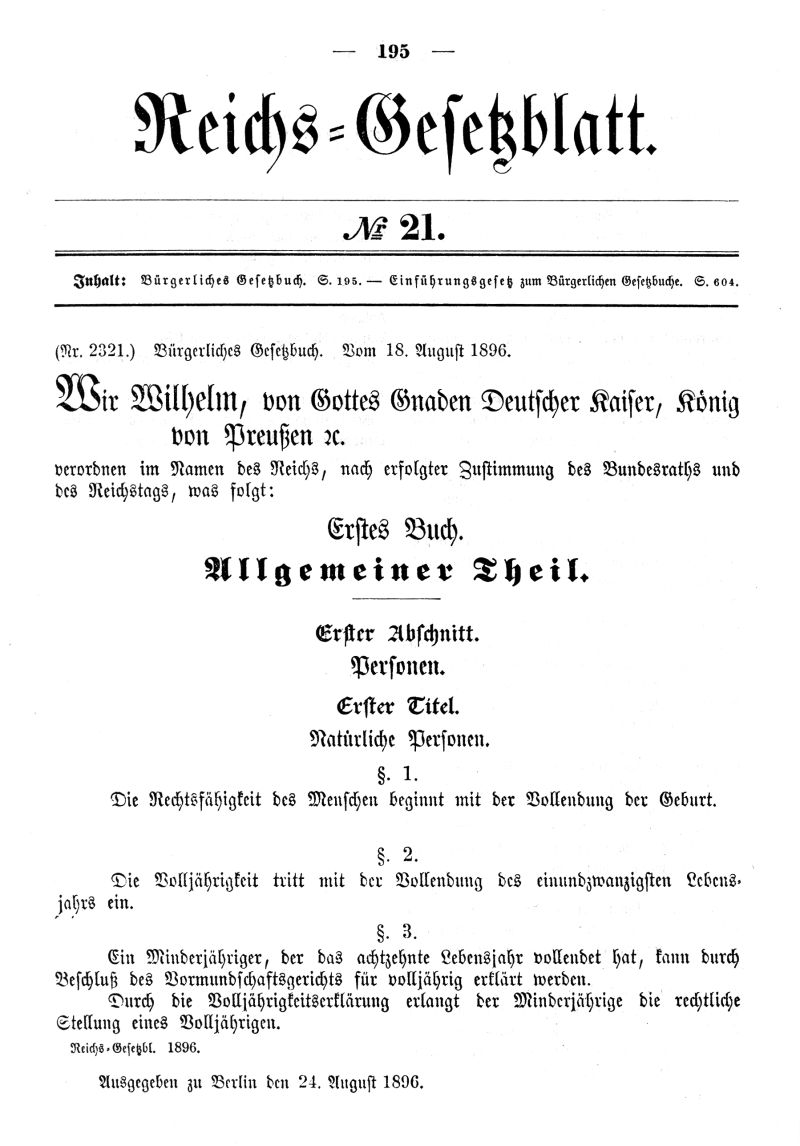
Publication in the Reich Law Gazette on 24 August 1896

The introduction in France of the Napoleonic Code in 1804 created in Germany a similar desire to draft a civil code (despite the opposition of Friedrich Carl von Savigny’s Historical School of Law) which would systematize and unify the various heterogeneous laws that were in effect in the country. However, such an undertaking during the German Confederation would have been difficult because the appropriate legislative body did not exist.

In 1871, most of the various German states were united into the German Empire. In the beginning, civil law legislative power was held by the individual states, not the Empire (Reich) that was composed of those states. An amendment to the constitution passed in 1873 (named Lex Miquel-Lasker in reference to the amendment's sponsors, representatives Johannes von Miquel and Eduard Lasker) transferred this legislative authority to the Reich. Various committees were then formed to draft a bill that was to become a civil law codification for the entire country, replacing the civil law systems of the states.

A first draft code, in 1888, did not meet with favour. A second committee of 22 members, comprising not only jurists but also representatives of financial interests and of the various ideological currents of the time, compiled a second draft. After significant revisions, the BGB was passed by the Reichstag in 1896. It was put into effect on 1 January 1900, and has been the central codification of Germany's civil law ever since.

=== Nazi Germany ===
In Nazi Germany, there were plans to replace the BGB with a new codification to be titled Volksgesetzbuch ("People's Code"), which was meant to reflect Nazi ideology better than the BGB, but these plans never came to fruition. Instead, some the BGB's general principles such as the doctrine of good faith (§ 242 BGB, Grundsatz von Treu und Glauben) were used to interpret the code in a Nazi-friendly way. As a result, the political urgency to draft a completely new code more amenable to Nazis ideology dissipated since many of the BGB's flexible doctrines and principles could be re-interpreted to serve the needs of the Nazi regime. In particular, using the good faith doctrine under § 242 BGB (see above) or the contra bonos mores doctrine under § 138 BGB (sittenwidriges Rechtsgeschäft), one could void transactions on the grounds they were contra bonos mores, i.e. against public policy or morals. In this way the Nazis and their willing judges and lawyers were able to direct the law in a way to serve their nationalist ideology.

=== Germany after 1945 ===
When Germany was divided into a capitalist state in the West and a socialist state in the East after World War II, the BGB continued to regulate the civil law in both parts of Germany. Over time the BGB regulations were replaced in East Germany by new laws, beginning with a family code in 1966 and ending with a new civil code (Zivilgesetzbuch) in 1976 and a contract act in 1982. Since Germany's reunification in 1990, the BGB has again been the codification encompassing the civil law of Germany.

In West and reunited Germany, the BGB has been amended many times. The most significant changes were made in 2002, when the Law of Obligations, one of the BGB's five main parts, was extensively reformed. Despite its status as a civil code, legal precedent does play a limited role; the way the courts construe and interpret the regulations of the code has changed in many ways, and continues to evolve and develop, due particularly to the high degree of abstraction throughout. In recent years lawmakers have tried to bring some outside legislation "back into the BGB". For example, aspects of landlord and tenant law, which had been scattered across various federal legislation such as the Miethöhegesetz ("Rental Rate Act") were consolidated and incorporated into the BGB.

The BGB continues to be the centerpiece of the German legal system. Other legislation builds on principles defined in the BGB. The German Commercial Code, for example, contains only those rules relevant to merchant partnerships and limited partnerships, as the general rules for partnerships in the BGB also apply. The BGB is typical of 19th century legislation and has been criticized from its very beginnings for its lack of social responsibility. Lawmakers and legal practice have improved the system over the years to adapt the BGB in this respect with more or less success. Recently, the influence of EU legislation has been quite strong: the BGB is subject to interpretation in the light of EU law, for example in Pia Messner v Firma Stefan Krüger (ECJ case C-489/07) a preliminary ruling stated that must be EU law "must be interpreted as precluding a provision of national law (in this case, Paragraph 346(1) to (3) of the BGB) which provides in general that, in the case of withdrawal by a consumer within the withdrawal period, a seller may claim compensation for the value of the use of the consumer goods acquired under a distance contract". The BGB has seen many changes as a result of EU law.

== Structure ==
The BGB follows a modified pandectist structure, derived from Roman law: like other Roman-influenced codes, it regulates the law of persons, property, family and inheritance, but unlike the French Code civil or the Austrian Civil Code, a chapter containing generally applicable regulations is placed first. Consequently, the BGB contains five main parts or books:

- the general part (allgemeiner Teil), Sections 1 through 240, comprising regulations that have effect on all the other four parts, such as personality rights and civil status, emancipation, legal capacity, declarations of will, formation of contracts, rescission, limitation periods, and agency
- law of obligations (Schuldrecht), Sections 241 through 853, describing contractual obligations and other civil obligations, including torts and unjust enrichment
- property law (Sachenrecht), Sections 854 through 1296, describing possession, ownership, other property rights (e.g. servitudes, security interests, rentcharge, land charge), and how those rights can be transferred. (Note: The highly specialised Bienenrecht (bee law) is found under the property law portion (§§ 961–964). This comes from the fact that, in legal terms, bees become ferae naturae as soon as they leave their managed hive. Since animals ferae naturae normally constitute unowned property, the said sections provide for the beekeeping owner to maintain his claim over the swarm. These sections are the least cited regulations in German law, with not a single relevant decision of any higher court since the BGB entered into force.)
- family law (Familienrecht), Sections 1297 through 1921, describing marriage, marital property schemes, legal guardianship, and other legal relationships among family members
- inheritance law (Erbrecht), Sections 1922 through 2385, which regulate what happens to a deceased's estate, as well as the law of wills and contracts concerning succession (pacta successoria).

== Abstract title transfer ==
One of the BGB's fundamental components is the doctrine of abstract transfer of title in which a contract purporting to transfer property and conveyances that transfer title must be treated separately and follow their own rules.

First, following the traditio principle (or in German: Trennungsprinzip, literally ‘separation principle’), the Code draws a sharp distinction between obligationary agreements (BGB, Book 2), which create enforceable obligations, and real agreements (BGB, Book 3; e.g. alienation, assignment, or inheritance), which transfer property rights. In short, buying property, on the one hand, and delivery or conveyancing (traditio), on the other, are two separate acts, meaning that concluding a sales contract does not automatically vest title to property, but merely gives the buyer the personal right (Note: This personal right is formally known as ius in personam ad rem acquirendam.) to demand the transfer of title. Here, German law follows the titulus–modus distinction of Roman law and adheres to the maxim traditionibus non nudis pactis dominia rerum transferuntur, ‘ownership is transferred by delivery (or other disposition) and not by contract alone’. This agrees with legal jurisdictions that have a causal system of title transfer, such as Austrian, Swiss, Dutch, and Spanish laws; however, this does not agree with France and French-influenced legal jurisdictions, under which an obligationary agreement is sufficient to transfer title and no subsequent conveyance is needed.

Second, the German abstract system follows the Abstraktionsprinzip, derived from the works of the pandectist scholar Friedrich Carl von Savigny, according to which title transfer does not depend on the validity of the underlying causa (i.e. the prior contract) of delivery or the conveyance; in other words, a conveyance is sine causa (without legal consideration). Thus, if a contract of sale or gift of property should be found to be invalid, title shall nevertheless pass if property has been delivered or if a conveyance is valid and has gone into effect. Conversely, title transfer based on an invalid obligationary agreement may give rise to a restitutionary obligation (e.g. unjust enrichment) for the transferee to restore the property, but until the property is transferred back, again by way of delivery or a conveyance, title would remain vested in the transferee. This marks a sharp break with Roman law, which viewed the obligationary contract and the conveyance as causally linked (known as the Kausalprinzip), meaning that if the contract is invalid, so too is the conveyance, since one cannot transfer what one does not have. Here, German law distinguishes itself from the causal title transfer system of e.g. Austrian, Swiss, Dutch, and Spanish laws, which do not recognize the Abstraktionsprinzip and thereby stick more closely to Roman law.

Under the BGB, a sales contract alone, for example, would not lead to the buyer acquiring ownership, but merely impose an obligation on the seller to transfer ownership of the sold property. The seller is then contractually obligated to form another, and separate, agreement to transfer the property. Only once this second agreement is formed, the buyer acquires ownership of the purchased property. Consequently, these two procedures are regulated differently: the contracting parties' obligations are regulated by art. 433, whereas real contracts alienating movable property are provided for under art. 929. The payment of the purchase price (or valuable consideration) is treated likewise.

In day-to-day business, this differentiation is not needed, because both types of contract would be formed simultaneously by exchanging the property for payment of money. Although the abstract system can be seen as overly technical and contradicting the usual common-sense interpretation of commercial transactions, it is undisputed among the German legal community. The main advantage of the abstract system is its ability to provide a secure legal construction to nearly any financial transaction, however complicated this transaction may be.

A good example is retention of title. If someone buys something and pays the purchase price in installments, there are two conflicting interests at play: the buyer wants to have the purchased property immediately, whereas the seller wants to secure full payment of the purchase price. Under the abstract system, the BGB has a simple answer: the sales contract obligates the buyer to pay the full price and requires the seller to transfer property upon receipt of the last installment. As the sale obligations and the actual conveyance of ownership are embodied in two separate agreements, it is quite simple to secure both parties' interests. The seller maintains ownership of the property until the last payment, while the buyer merely possesses the property. If the buyer defaults, the seller may repossess the property just like any other owner.

Another advantage is that should the sales contract be found defective due to some vitiating factor (e.g. fraud, mistake, or undue influence), this would not affect the seller's ownership, thereby making it unnecessary to resell the property for the sake of transferring ownership back to the original seller. Instead, under the rules of unjust enrichment, the buyer is obligated to transfer the property back if possible or otherwise pay compensation.

== Template for other jurisdictions ==
- In 1896 and 1898, the Japanese government enacted a civil code (民法, Minpō) based on the first draft of the Bürgerliches Gesetzbuch; with post-World War II modifications, the code remains in effect.
- In 1923, the Government of Siam (Thailand) passed the Act establishing the Civil Code of B.E. 2466 (1923) which put into force the first two books of the Civil Code of Thailand. The enactment of the Civil Code (Thai: ประมวลกฎหมายแพ่ง, Pramwl kḍh̄māy phæ̀ng) was a major event in Thai legal history. As one of the few independent Asian countries during the second half of the nineteenth century, the Thai government had desired to adopt the western legal system as a part of the country's modernization efforts. The project started in the late nineteenth century and, initially, the Thai Civil Code was based on the French Civil Code. The advancement of legal science in Germany in the late 19th century, which culminated in the enactment of the Bürgerliches Gesetzbuch, convinced the government that the German code should be the model for Thailand's civil-law codification.
- In 1930, the first Chinese Civil Code was adopted, following mostly the model of the BGB. It is still in force in Taiwan but was repealed in the PRC in 1949, together with the whole legislation enacted under Chang Kai-shek. Still, the influence of the Germanic civil law tradition is present in the current Civil Code of the People's Republic of China.

== See also ==
- French Civil Code
- European Civil Code
