= Otto Georg Thierack =

German Nazi jurist and politician (1889–1946)

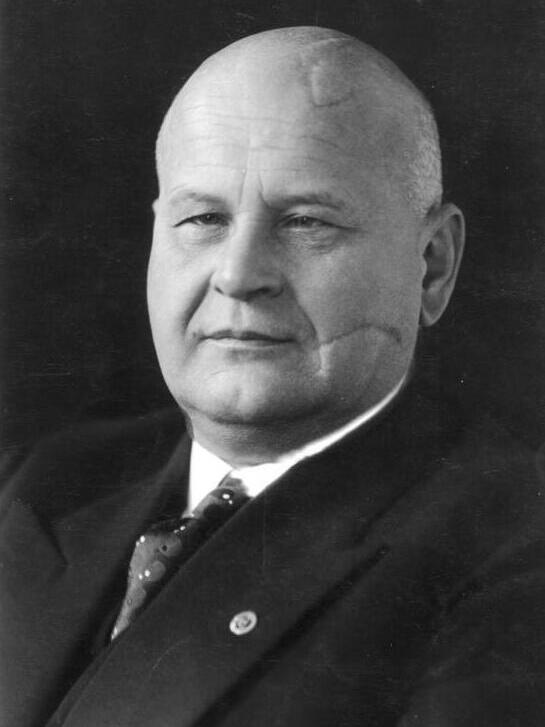
- Thierack in 1940

Minister of Justice
- In office 20 August 1942 – 5 May 1945
- Chancellor: Adolf Hitler; Joseph Goebbels
- Preceded by: Franz Schlegelberger (acting)
- Succeeded by: Herbert Klemm (acting)

President of the Academy for German Law
- In office 20 August 1942 – 8 May 1945
- Preceded by: Hans Frank
- Succeeded by: Office abolished

Judge President of the People's Court
- In office 1 May 1936 – 20 August 1942
- Preceded by: Wilhelm Bruner
- Succeeded by: Roland Freisler

Personal details
- Born: 19 April 1889 Wurzen, Kingdom of Saxony, German Empire
- Died: 26 October 1946 (aged 57) Sennelager, North Rhine-Westphalia, Allied-occupied Germany
- Party: Nazi Party

Otto Georg Thierack (19 April 1889 – 26 October 1946) was a German Nazi jurist and politician.

== Early life and career ==
Thierack was born in Wurzen in Saxony. He took part in the First World War from 1914 to 1918 as a volunteer, reaching the rank of lieutenant. He suffered a facial injury and was decorated with the Iron Cross, second class. After the war ended, he resumed his interrupted law studies and ended them in 1920 with his Assessor (junior lawyer) examination. In the same year, he was hired as a court Assessor in Saxony.

== Joining the Nazi Party ==
On 1 August 1932, Thierack joined the Nazi Party. After the Nazis seized power in 1933, he managed within a very short time to rise high in the ranks from a prosecutor to President of the People's Court (Volksgerichtshof). The groundwork on which this rise was built was not merely that Thierack had been a Nazi Party member, but rather also that he had been leader of the National Socialist jurists' organization, the so-called Rechtswahrerbund.

== Justice Minister of Saxony ==
Having been appointed Saxony's justice minister on 12 May 1933, it was Thierack's job to "nazify" the administration of justice within the region. After going through several mid-level professional posts, he became vice president of the Reich Court in 1935, and in May 1936 president of the Volksgerichtshof, which had been newly founded in 1934. He held this job, interrupted as it was by two stints in the armed forces, until August 1942, when he was succeeded in the position by Roland Freisler. On 20 August 1942, he succeeded Hans Frank as President of the Academy for German Law.

== Reich Minister of Justice ==
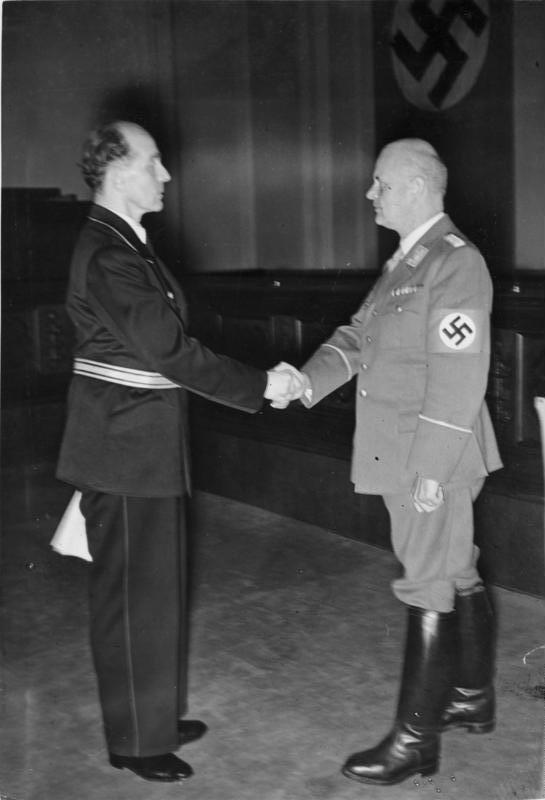
Otto Thierack (right) with Judge Roland Freisler at the end of August 1942

On 20 August 1942, Thierack assumed the office of Reich Minister of Justice. He introduced the monthly Richterbriefe in October 1942, in which were presented model – from the Nazi leaders' standpoint – decisions, with names left out, upon which German jurisprudence was to be based. He also introduced the so-called Vorschauen and Nachschauen ("previews" and "inspections"). After this, the higher state court presidents, in proceedings of public interest, had at least every two weeks to discuss with the public prosecutor's office and the State Court president – who had to pass this on the responsible criminal courts – how a case was to be judged before the court's decision.

When he became Reich Minister of Justice in August 1942, Thierack saw to it that the lengthy paperwork involved in clemency proceedings for those sentenced to death was greatly shortened. In September of that year, he caused all those in custody who were "Jews, Gypsies, Russians, Poles sentenced to over three years, Czechs, or Germans serving a sentence of over eight years" to be classified as "asocial elements" and transferred to Reichsführer-SS Heinrich Himmler to be worked to death.

At Thierack's instigation, the execution shed at Plötzensee Prison in Berlin was outfitted with eight iron hooks in December 1942 so that several people could be put to death at once, by hanging (there had already been a guillotine there for quite a while). The mass executions began on 7 September 1943 but due to their rapidity some prisoners were hanged "by mistake". Thierack dismissed these as errors and demanded that the hangings continue. Thierack was named to continue as Minister of Justice in Hitler's political testament. He served in the brief Goebbels cabinet but was dismissed on 5 May 1945 by Hitler's successor, Reichspräsident Karl Dönitz.

== Arrest and suicide ==
The Allies arrested Thierack after the end of World War II. Before he was brought to trial before the court at the Nuremberg Judges' Trial, Thierack committed suicide in Sennelager, Paderborn, by poisoning himself.

Legal offices
Preceded by Fritz Rehn	Judge President of the People's Court; 1936 – August 1942	Succeeded by Roland Freisler
