= National Socialist Association of Legal Professionals =

Nazi German organization of jurists

- Nationalsozialistischer Rechtswahrerbund
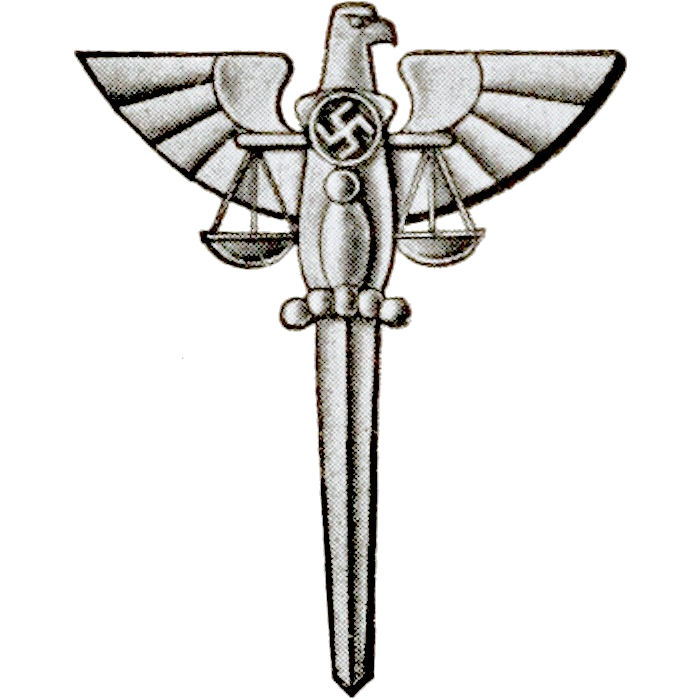
- Abbreviation: NSRB
- Formation: September 1928
- Founder: Hans Frank
- Dissolved: 10 October 1945
- Type: Professional association
- Legal status: Defunct, illegal
- Location: Germany
- Parent organization: Nazi Party
- Formerly called: Association of National Socialist German Legal Professionals (1928–1936)

The National Socialist Association of Legal Professionals (German: Nationalsozialistischer Rechtswahrerbund, NSRB) was the professional organization of German legal professionals (lawyers, judges, public prosecutors, notaries and legal academics) in the Third Reich from 1936 to 1945.

It was founded as the Association of National Socialist German Legal Professionals (German: Bund Nationalsozialistischer Deutscher Juristen, or BNSDJ), in 1928 and adopted its later name in 1936.

== History ==
The Association of National Socialist German Legal Professionals was founded by Hans Frank in 1928 as an organization within the Nazi party. Frank maintained in a diary entry in August, 1942 that Hitler had made him leader of the organization in 1926. Frank was occupied with the task of building up the association. At first it consisted mainly of attorneys; later it included all members of the legal profession. In 1929 it had 90 members; by the end of 1931 there were 701, and at the end of 1932, 1,374 people belonged. On April 25, 1933 Frank was named by Reichspräsident Paul von Hindenburg to be Imperial Commissar for the Standardization (Gleichschaltung) of Justice and for Renewal of the Legal System (Reichskommissar für die Gleichschaltung der Justiz und für die Erneuerung der Rechtsordnung). Frank thereby became one of the most influential jurists in the National Socialist era.

In the course of the Gleichschaltung Frank was concerned to set aside all independent organizations of jurists and to bring them into the BNSDJ. Following the Nazi party's pause in accepting any new members on April 19, 1933, in May, 1933 the BNDSJ suspended its requirement for membership applicants to be members of the Nazi party, so that judicial associations not already affiliated with the party could be merged into the BNDSJ. This included, among others, the Deutsche Anwaltverein, the Deutsche Richterbund (DRB) and the Republikanische Richterbund. The first of these became part of the BNSDJ of its own accord. The DRB, which had greeted the setting aside of the Weimar Republic, entered the BNSDJ as a group on May 25, 1933 and remained there at first, until it finally dissolved itself at the end of 1933. On March 14, 1933 the far smaller Republikanische Richterbund was banned and dissolved itself. Many of the judges in this organization were arbitrarily forced to retire in accord with the "Law for the Restoration of Officialdom" (Gesetz zur Wiederherstellung des Berufsbeamtentums).

The organization behind the German Jurists' Conference (Deutschen Juristentag) was also dissolved. The conference it had been planning for Autumn, 1933 was canceled, and instead was held in October, 1933 under the umbrella of the BNSDJ's fourth conference in Leipzig. There, Frank proclaimed among other things the "Academy for German Law" (Akademie für Deutsches Recht), which was then legally founded in 1934. Hans Frank was President of the Academy until 1942 and leader of its committee on legal philosophy. The BNSDJ by then was no longer purely an organization within the Party, but rather one which stood alongside the Party. With Gleichschaltung and the incorporation of the professional jurist organizations, the membership of the BNSDJ climbed sharply. In 1935 it had about 70,000 members including 16,348 judges. In 1936, following its renaming to NSRB, the organization had about 85,000 members, while in 1939 there were about 101,000.

== Bibliography ==
- Königseder, Angelika (2001). Recht und nationalsozialistische Herrschaft: Berliner Anwälte 1933–1945 [Law and National Socialist rule: Berlin Lawyers 1933–1945] (in German). Bonn. ISBN 3-8240-0528-X.
- Sunnus, Michael (1990). Der NS-Rechtswahrerbund: (1928–1945); zur Geschichte der nationalsozialistischen Juristenorganisation [The National Socialist Association of German Legal Professionals (1928–1945); the History of the National Socialist Lawyers' Organisation]. Rechtshistorische Reihe (in German). Vol. 78. Frankfurt am Main: Lang. ISBN 3-631-42734-4.
