= Freisler (surname) =

Freisler (also spelled Freissler) is a German surname. Notable people with the surname include:

- Anton Freissler (1838–1916), Austrian elevator manufacturer
- Fritz Freisler (1881–1955), Austrian screenwriter and film director
- Marion Freisler (1910–1997), wife of Roland
- Oswald Freisler (1895–1939), German lawyer, brother of Roland
- Roland Freisler (1893–1945), German jurist
