= U-Bahn Serfaus =

Underground hovertrain in Tyrol, Austria

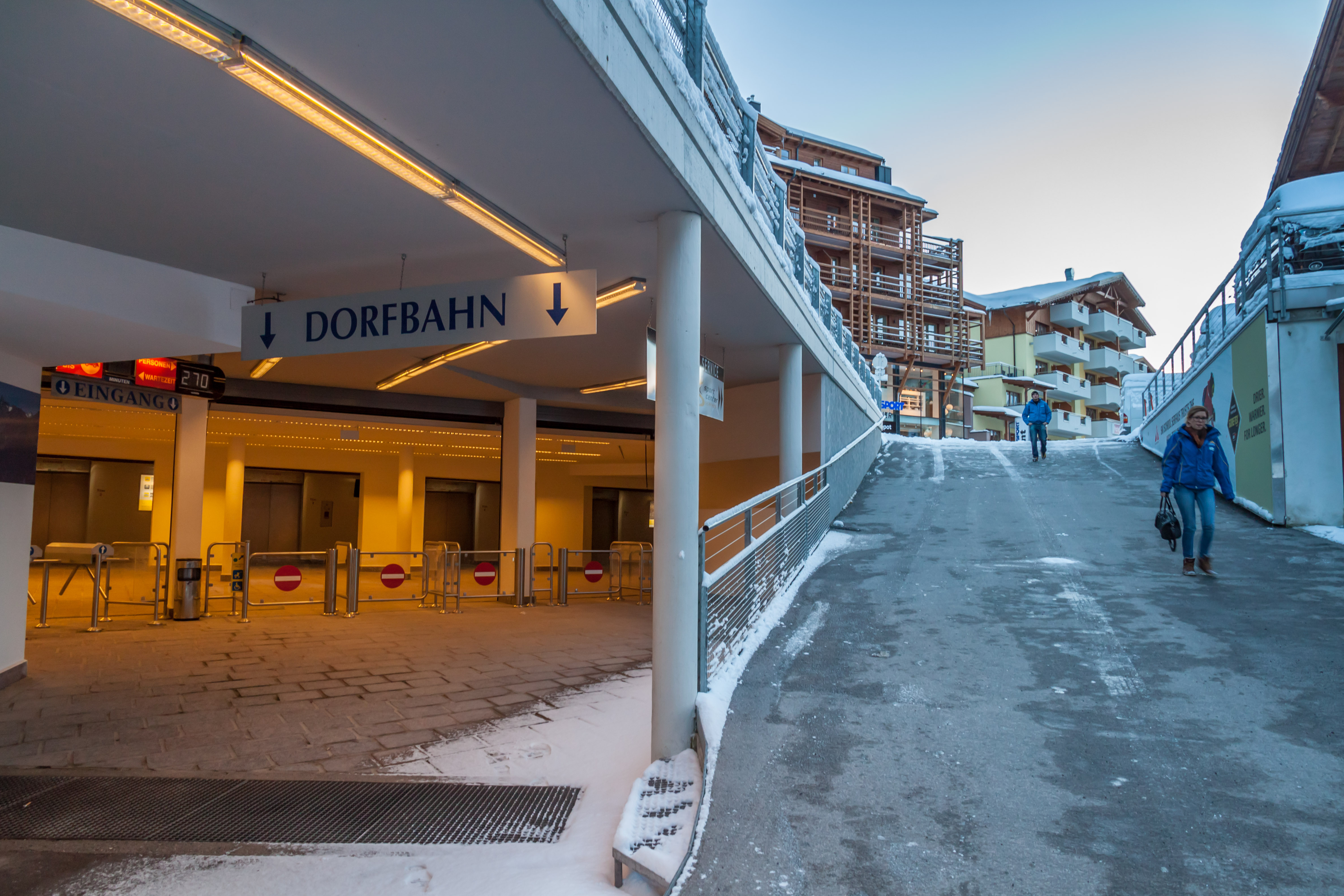
- Seilbahn station

Overview
- Locale: Serfaus, Austria
- Transit type: Funicular
- Number of lines: 1
- Number of stations: 4

Operation
- Began operation: 14 December 1985; 40 years ago
- Operator: Seilbahn Komperdell GmbH

Technical
- System length: 1.3 km (0.81 mi)
- Electrification: 950 V AC OHLE

The U-Bahn Serfaus (until 2019 Dorfbahn Serfaus, lit. 'Serfaus Village Railway') is an underground air cushion people mover system in the Tyrolian village of Serfaus in Austria.

== Overview ==
Serfaus is a busy ski resort, and during the season has to cater for large numbers of skiers. The slopes are accessed by a cable car and a gondola lift, whose lower stations are situated at one end of the village's main street. A large car park is located at the other end of this street, and the Dorfbahn connects the two, allowing the conversion of the village into a car-free zone. Besides the two terminal stations at Seilbahn (cable car) and Parkplatz (car park), there are two intermediate stations in the village centre.

The line was built in 1985 by the Freissler-Otis company, and began operation on 14 December that year, with its official opening taking place on 16 January the following year. It consists of a single, 1,280 m (4,200 ft) one-track line, with a single train operating on a shuttle basis. The train comprises two cars, is suspended on an air cushion, and is moved by a cable haulage system. The tunnel is 3.24 m (10.6 ft) wide and 3.52 m (11.5 ft) high. The train can carry 390 people, and travels at a speed of 40 km/h (25 mph).

During the winter season the line operates between 07:45 and 18:45, and between 07:45 and 17:30 or 18:15 in the summer. A single journey takes 7 minutes, with the intermediate stations served only in the respective main load direction (in the morning toward Seilbahn, in the afternoon toward Parkplatz). The service is free of charge.

Extensive renovations were carried out from 2016 to 2019, and the new train, manufactured by Leitner Ropeways, began operating in July 2019, almost doubling its passenger capacity.

== Stations ==
Schematic network plan of the U-Bahn Serfaus

| Station | km | Notes |
|---|---|---|
| Parkplatz | 0.0 | Parking area |
| Kirche | 0.6 | Church, town's centre |
| Zentrum | 0.8 | Formerly named Raika. (Note: Named after "Raiffeisen Bank", shortened as "Raika") Bank, town centre |
| Seilbahn | 1.3 | Cable Car station |

Route of U-Bahn Serfaus

== Gallery ==
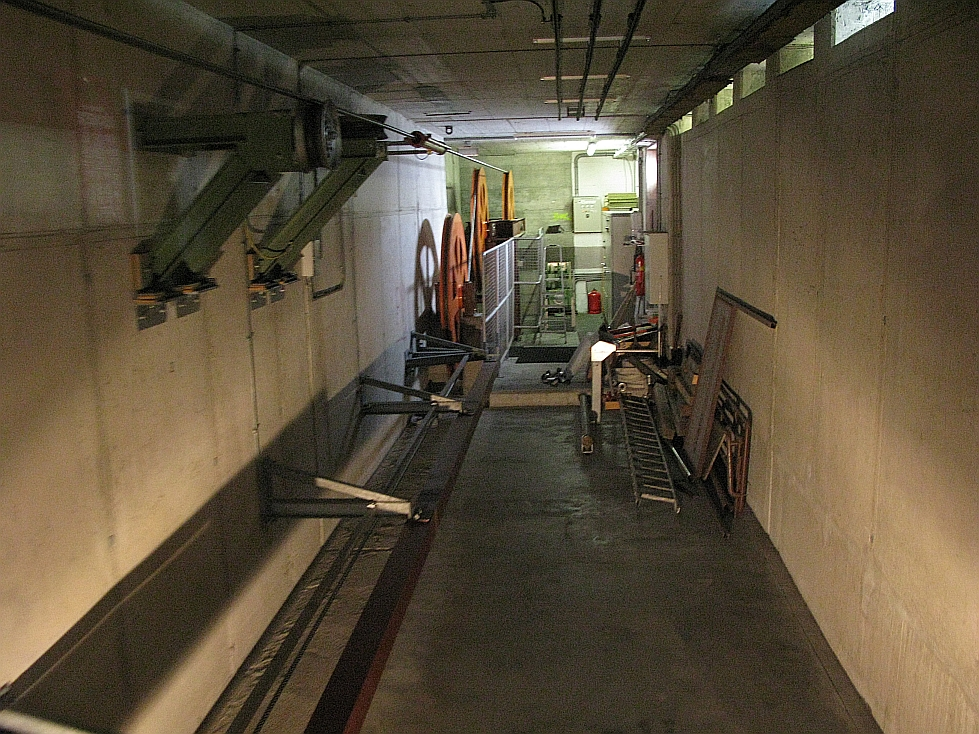
The terminal point of U-bahn tunnel

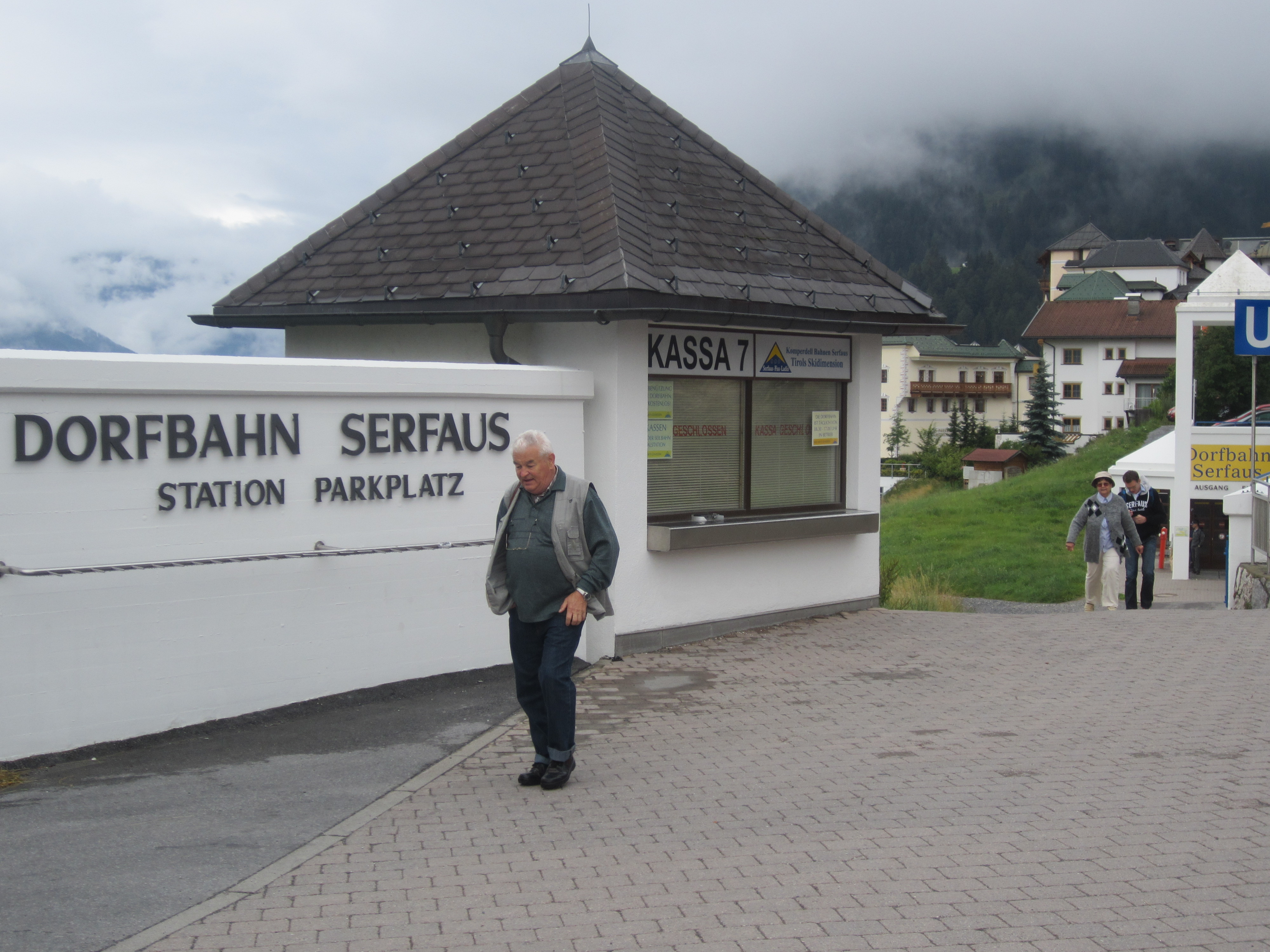
Parkplatz station

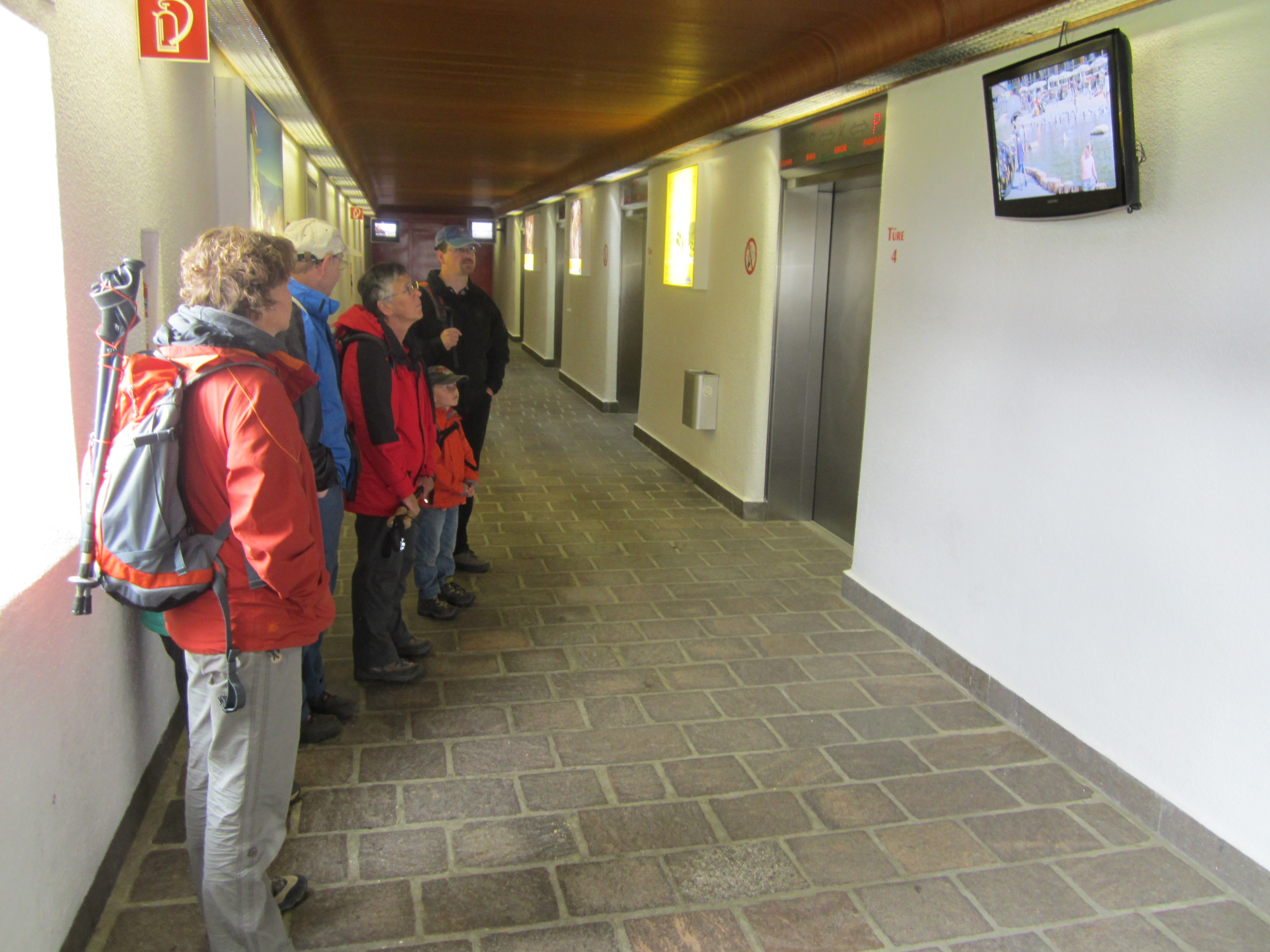
Internal platform screen doors at most stations (before renovation), with LED indicators

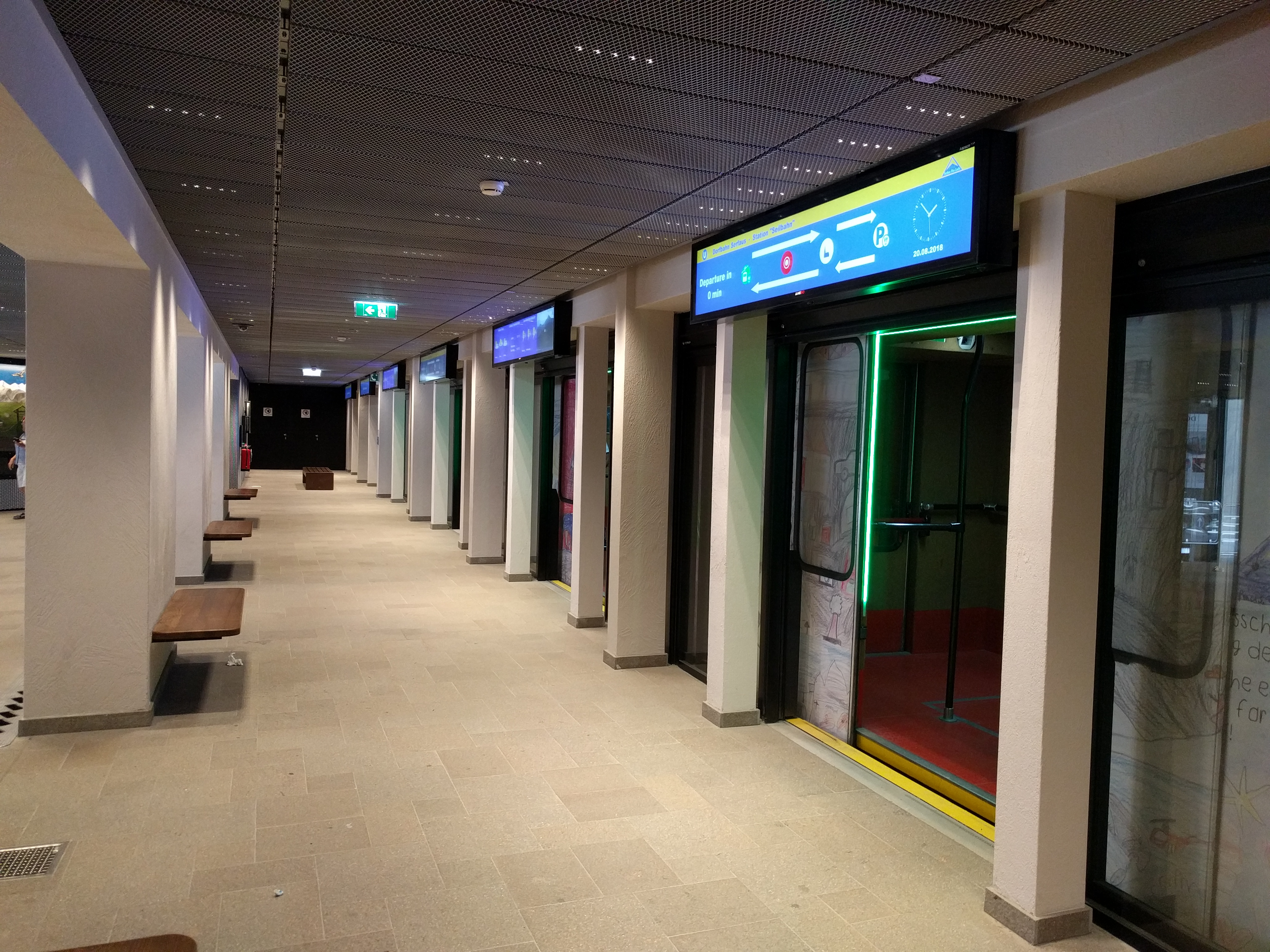
Glass platform screen doors at Seilbahn station, with LCD indicators

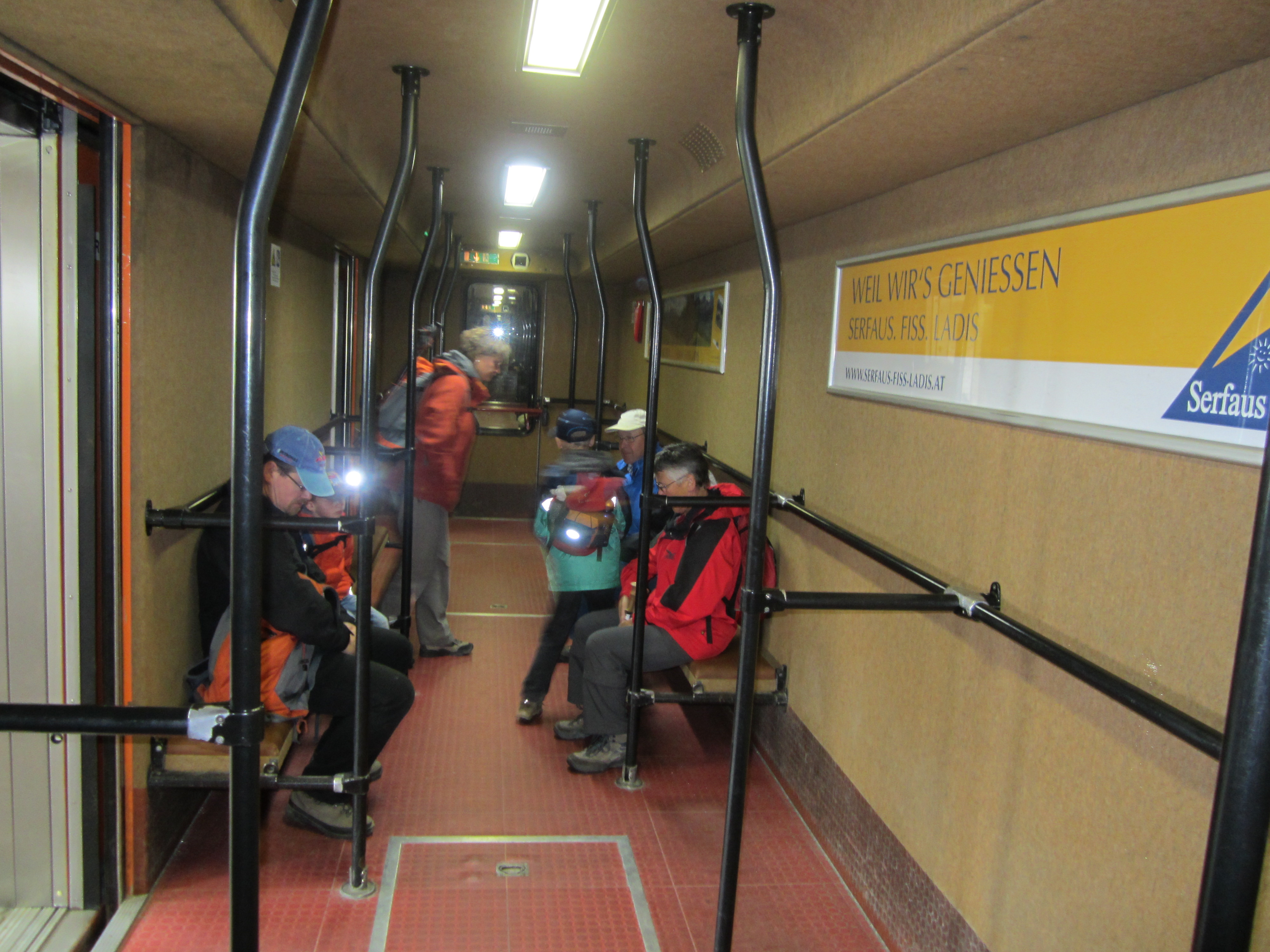
Interior of the old Otis train

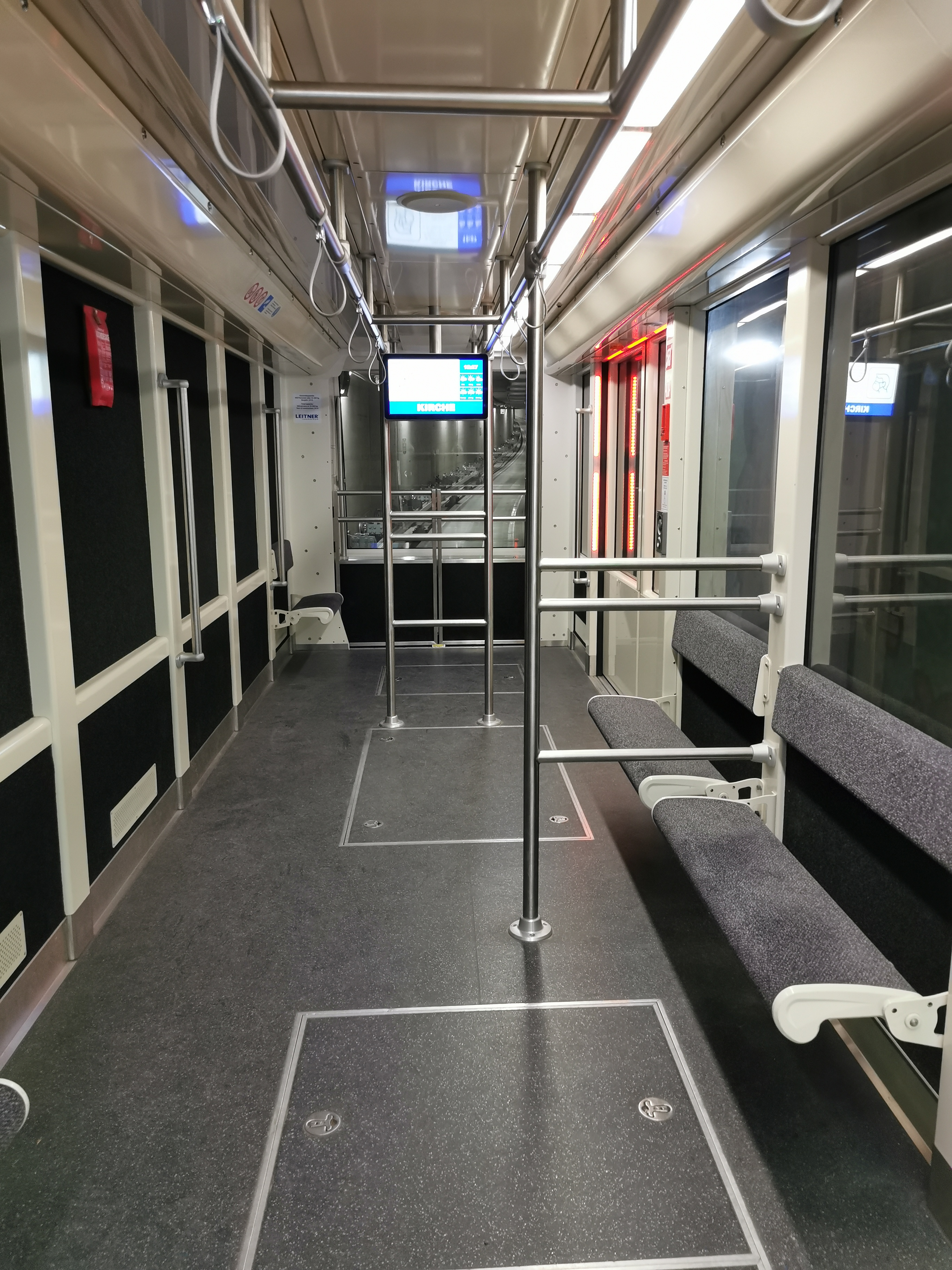
Interior of the new Leitner train
