= List of elevator manufacturers =

This is a list of companies that manufacture elevators.

== Current elevator manufacturers ==
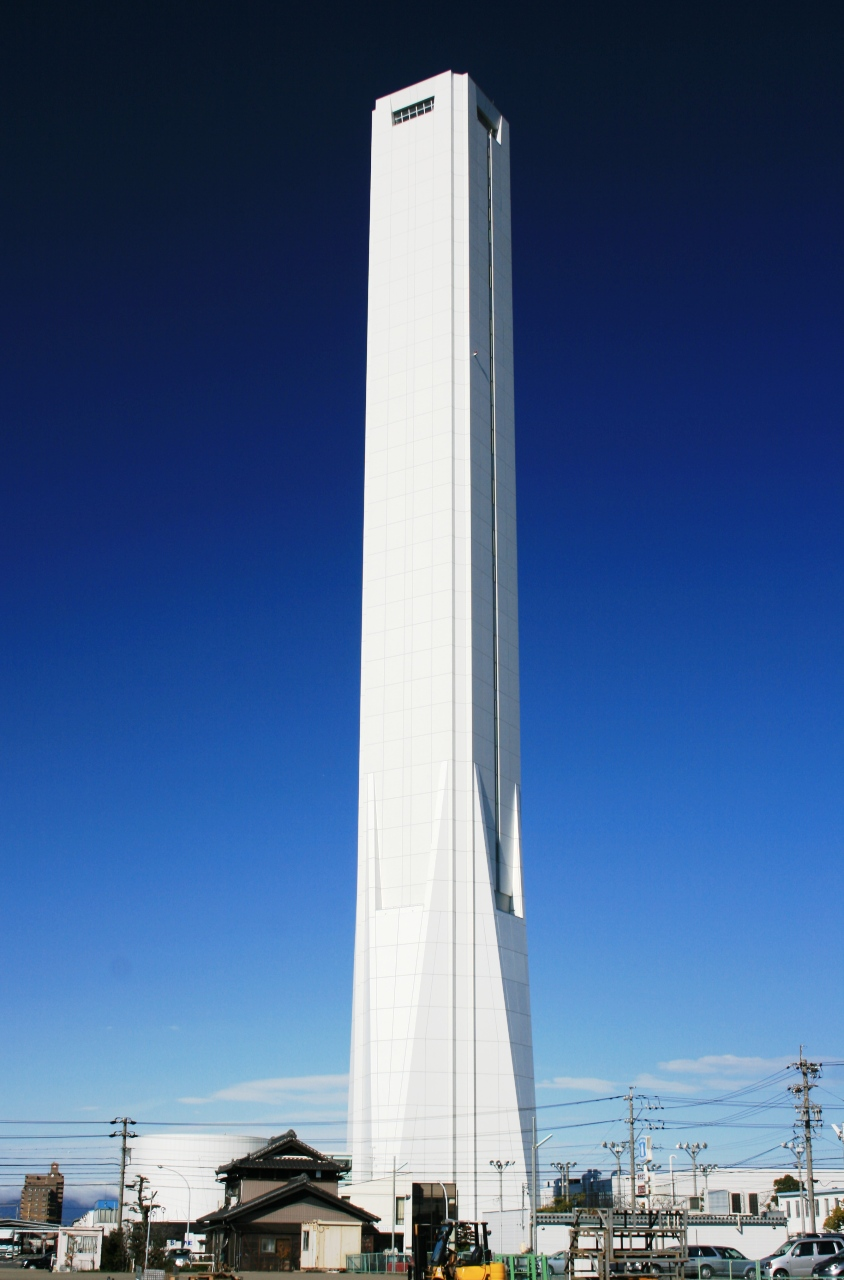
The Mitsubishi Electric-owned Solae Test Tower (173 m) in Inazawa City, Japan, is the world's 4th tallest elevator testing tower after Hyundai elevator test tower at Icheon plant (205 m) South Korea, the Kone Tytyri test tower (235 m) and the Rottweil Test Tower (246 m).

=== Bangladesh ===
- Walton Group

=== Finland ===
- Kone

=== France ===
- Saint-Gobain

=== Germany ===
- TK Elevator
- Wittur

=== India ===
- Johnson Lifts

=== Japan ===
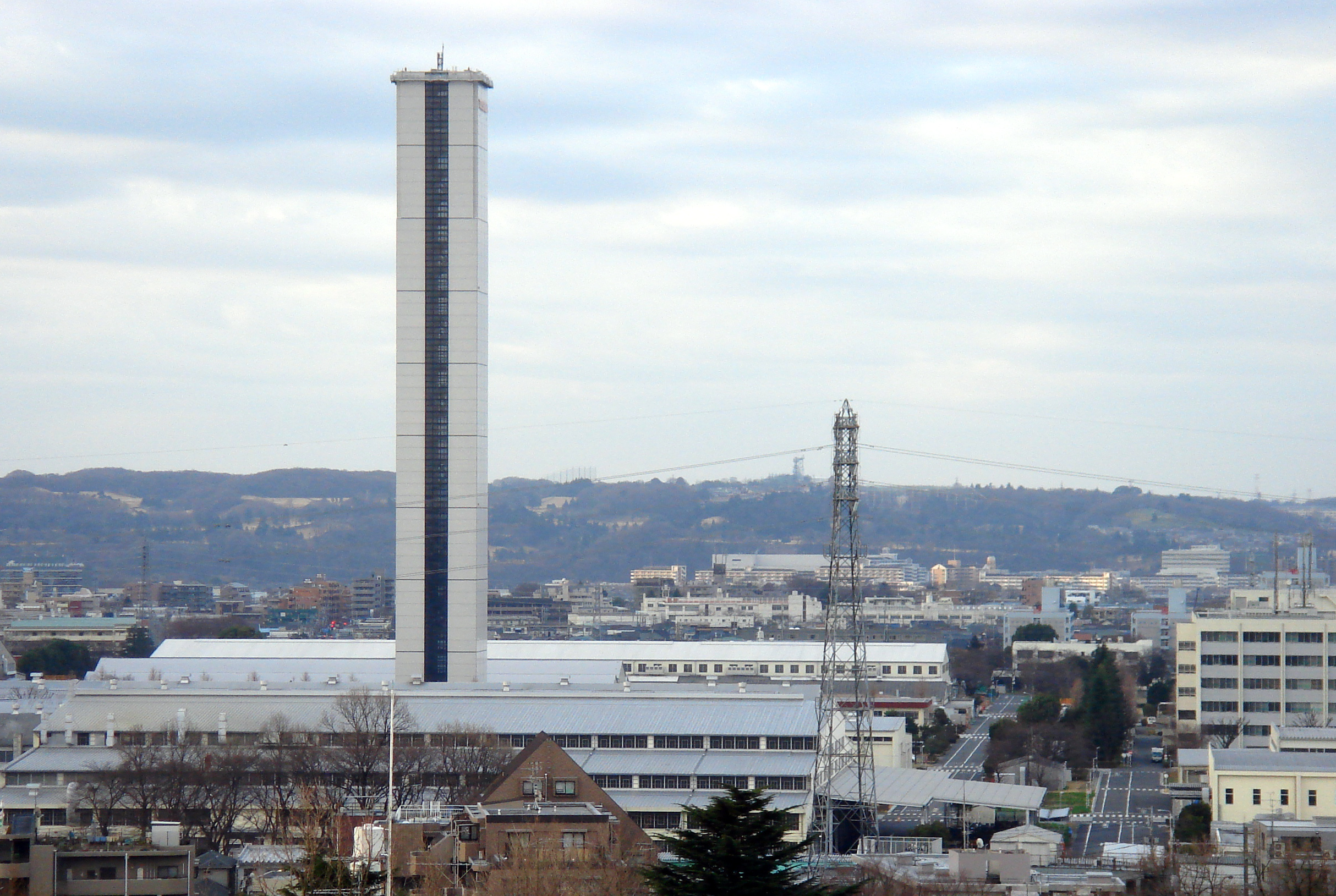
Elevator Research Tower of Toshiba Fuchu Complex

- Aichi small-elevator manufacturing corporation
- Fujitec
- Hitachi
- Mitsubishi Electric
- Toshiba

=== South Korea ===
- Hyundai Elevator

=== Switzerland ===
- Schindler Group

=== United Kingdom ===
- Stannah Lifts

=== United States ===
- McKinley Elevator Corporation
- Otis Elevator Company

== Former elevator manufacturers ==
- Dover Corporation: Elevator division acquired by Thyssen AG in 1999.
- Montgomery Elevator: Acquired by Kone, Canadian division in 1985 and U.S. division in 1994.
- Marshall Elevator: Sold to Otis
- Schweizerische Aufzügefabrik AG
- Thyssen AG: Merged with Krupp and became ThyssenKrupp in 1999, with subsidiary ThyssenKrupp Elevator AG
- ThyssenKrupp Elevator AG announced in 2021 a name change and rebranding to TK Elevator
- Westinghouse: Elevator division bought by Schindler in 1989
- Anton Freissler – invented and developed a number of paternoster and elevators. Incorporated into Otis
- Johns and Waygood (founded by Peter Johns), which became Johns Perry. The business was acquired by Boral in 1986 and the elevator operation divested to Otis in 1995.

== See also ==
- Lists of companies

=== Other List of Elevators ===
- List of elevator accidents
