= Roland Freisler =

German jurist (1893–1945)

- Freisler in 1942

Judge President of the People's Court
- In office 20 August 1942 – 3 February 1945
- Chancellor: Adolf Hitler
- Preceded by: Otto Georg Thierack
- Succeeded by: Wilhelm Crohne (acting); Harry Haffner

State Secretary of the Justice Ministry
- In office 1 April 1935 – 20 August 1942
- Minister: Franz Gürtner
- Preceded by: Position created
- Succeeded by: Curt Rothenberger

Additional positions
- 1933–1935: State Secretary, Prussian Justice Ministry
- 1933–1945: Member of the Prussian State Council
- 1933–1945: Member of the Greater German Reichstag

Personal details
- Born: 30 October 1893 Celle, Hanover Province, Kingdom of Prussia, German Empire
- Died: 3 February 1945 (aged 51) Berlin, Free State of Prussia, Nazi Germany
- Cause of death: Blunt force trauma caused by a falling masonry pillar
- Resting place: Waldfriedhof Dahlem, Berlin, Germany
- Party: Nazi Party
- Other political affiliations: Völkisch-Social Bloc
- Spouse: Marion Russegger (m. 1928)
- Relations: Oswald Freisler (brother)
- Children: 2
- Education: University of Jena
- Profession: Judge, lawyer
- Civilian awards: Golden Party Badge

Military service
- Allegiance: German Empire
- Branch/service: Prussian Army
- Years of service: 1914–1918
- Rank: Leutnant
- Unit: 167th Infantry Regiment (1st Upper Alsatian); 22nd Division
- Battles/wars: World War I
- Military awards: Iron Cross, 2nd class

Karl Roland Freisler (30 October 1893 – 3 February 1945) was a German jurist, judge, and politician who served as the State Secretary of the Reich Ministry of Justice from 1935 to 1942 and as president of the People's Court from 1942 to 1945. During this time, Freisler became known for his histrionics, attempts to humiliate defendants, and his frequent use of the death penalty.

A law student at Kiel University, Freisler joined the Imperial German Army on the outbreak of the First World War and saw action on the Eastern Front, where he was wounded and taken prisoner of war by the Imperial Russian Army. On his return to Germany, he completed his law studies at the University of Jena and was awarded a Doctorate of Law in 1922. Freisler joined the Nazi Party in 1925, upon which he began defending Party members in court for acts of political violence.

After the Nazi seizure of power in 1933, Freisler was appointed State Secretary of the Prussian Ministry of Justice; two years later he became State Secretary in the unified Reich Ministry of Justice. In 1942, representing Acting Reichsminister of Justice Franz Schlegelberger, Freisler attended the Wannsee Conference.

In August 1942, Freisler succeeded Otto Georg Thierack as president of the People's Court. Under Freisler, the number of death sentences imposed by the court rose dramatically, and he presided over, amongst others, the show trials of the White Rose resistance group and those involved in the 20 July plot. Freisler handed out over 5,000 death sentences during his three-year tenure before being killed in February 1945 during an American bombing raid on Berlin.

== Early life ==
Roland Freisler was born on 30 October 1893 in Celle, Lower Saxony, the son of Julius Freisler (b. 1862 in Klantendorf, Moravia), an engineer and teacher, and Charlotte Auguste Florentine Schwerdtfeger (1863–1932). He was baptized as a Protestant on 13 December 1893. He had a younger brother, Oswald, who became a lawyer, and another brother who became a doctor. He attended the Wilhelmsgymnasium Kassel and received his Abitur in 1912, graduating at the top of his class.

== World War I ==
Freisler was attending law school at Kiel University upon the outbreak of World War I in 1914, which interrupted his studies. He saw active service in the German Imperial Army during the war after enlisting as a Fahnenjunker (officer cadet) in 1914 with the 167th Infantry Regiment (1st Upper Alsatian) in Kassel, and by 1915 he was a Leutnant. While serving on the front-line with the 22nd Division, he was awarded the Iron Cross 2nd class, for heroism in action. In October 1915, he was wounded in action on the Eastern Front and taken as a prisoner of war by Imperial Russian forces.

While a prisoner, Freisler learned to speak Russian and developed an interest in Marxism after the Russian Revolution had commenced. The Bolshevik provisional authority which took over responsibility for Freisler's prisoner of war camp made use of him as a camp "Commissar" (as he was described by them in his repatriated prisoner of war paperwork in 1918) administratively organizing the camp's food supplies from 1917 to 1918.

According to Nazi apologist historian Georg Franz–Willig's Ursprung der Hitlerbewegung 3-volume set published by Schütz/Pr. Oldendorf in 1974, the SPD newspaper Vorwärts of 3 May 1924 ran an article titled "SPIRITUAL KINSHIP: JEWISH–COMMUNIST, POPULAR REICHSTAG CANDIDATE", in which it stated that Freisler had been "until rather recently a member of the German Communist Party" and that this was interesting because "his grandmother was a full Jewess". However, H. W. Koch states that there is no evidence that Freisler was of Jewish heritage, and that after the Russian Revolution the description "Commissar" was simply the title given to anyone employed in an administrative post in the prison camps and had no political connotations. He also states that Freisler was never a Communist, although in the early days of his Nazi Party career in the 1920s he was on the movement's left wing.

In the late 1930s, during Joseph Stalin's Great Purge in the Soviet Union, Freisler attended the Moscow Trials to watch the proceedings against the condemned. Freisler later rejected any insinuation that he had ever co-operated with the Soviets, the ideological nemesis of Nazi Germany, but rumours about his time as a "Commissar" with the "Reds" cast a shadow over his subsequent career as a political official in Germany.

== Interwar legal and political career ==
Freisler returned to Germany in 1919 to complete his law studies at the University of Jena, and he qualified as a Doctor of Law in 1922. In 1924, he began working as an Assessor in Kassel and also was elected as a city councillor for the Völkisch-Social Bloc, an ultranationalist splinter party. He joined the Nazi Party in July 1925 (membership number 9,679) and immediately gained a position of authority within the organisation by using his legal training to defend Party members and Sturmabteilung (SA) men who were regularly facing prosecutions for acts of political violence. As an early party member, or Alter Kämpfer, he would later be awarded the Golden Party Badge. From late 1925 to September 1927, Freisler was the Deputy Gauleiter in Gau Hessen-Nassau Nord under Walter Schultz. He was also a member of the Party's National Socialist Motor Corps (NSKK), attaining the rank of NSKK-Brigadeführer in 1942.

As the Nazis changed from a fringe political beer hall and street fighting movement into a political party, Freisler was elected to the Hesse-Nassau provincial Landtag, a position he held between 1930 and 1933. In 1931, he joined the Association of National Socialist German Legal Professionals, founded by fellow Nazi lawyer Hans Frank. He was elected to the Prussian Landtag in April 1932 serving until the Landtag was dissolved in October 1933. At the November 1933 German parliamentary election he was elected as a deputy of the Reichstag, retaining his seat until his death. Reelected in 1936 and 1938, he represented electoral constituencies 19 (Hesse-Nassau), 13 (Schleswig-Holstein) and 35 (Mecklenburg), respectively.

In 1927, Karl Weinrich, a Nazi member of the Prussian Landtag along with Freisler, characterised his reputation in the rapidly expanding Nazi movement in the late 1920s: "Rhetorically Freisler is equal to our best speakers, if not superior; particularly on the broad masses he has influence, but thinking people mostly reject him. Party Comrade Freisler is usable as only a speaker though and is unsuitable for any position of authority because of his unreliability and moodiness".

== Career in Nazi Germany ==
In February 1933, after the Nazi seizure of power, Freisler was appointed Ministerial Director in the Prussian Ministry of Justice under Hans Kerrl. He was placed in charge of the personnel office and used his authority to force out Jewish members of the staff. By June, he was promoted to State Secretary in the Ministry. On 31 July, Prussian Minister president Hermann Göring appointed him to the recently reconstituted Prussian State Council. On the founding of the Academy for German Law by Hans Frank in October 1933, Freisler was made a member. He was the chairman of its Criminal Law Committee, head of its department of scientific studies and editor of the Academy newspaper. When the Prussian Ministry of Justice was merged with the Reich Ministry of Justice on 1 April 1935, Freisler became the State Secretary in the unified Ministry, where he served until August 1942.

Freisler's mastery of legal texts, mental agility, dramatic courtroom verbal dexterity and verbal force, in combination with his zealous conversion to Nazi ideology, made him the most feared judge in Nazi Germany, and the personification of Nazism in domestic law. Despite his talents and loyalty, Adolf Hitler never appointed him to any post beyond the legal system. That might have been because he was a lone figure, lacking support within the senior echelons of the Nazi hierarchy but he had also been politically compromised by his brother, Oswald Freisler, also a lawyer. Oswald had acted as a defence counsel against the regime's authority several times during the increasingly politically driven trials by which the Nazis sought to enforce their control of German society and he had the habit of wearing his Nazi Party membership badge in court whilst doing so. Propaganda minister Joseph Goebbels reproached Oswald Freisler and reported his actions to Adolf Hitler who ordered Freisler's expulsion from the Party. (Oswald Freisler died, allegedly by suicide, in 1939.)

In 1941, in a discussion at the "Führer Headquarters" about whom to appoint to replace Franz Gürtner, the Reich Justice Minister, who had died, Goebbels suggested Freisler as an option; Hitler's reply, referring to Freisler's alleged "Red" past, was "That old Bolshevik? No!"

== Contribution to the Nazification of the law ==
Freisler was a committed Nazi ideologist and used his legal skills to adapt its theories into practical law-making and judicature. He published a paper titled Die rassebiologische Aufgabe bei der Neugestaltung des Jugendstrafrechts ("The racial-biological task involved in the reform of juvenile criminal law"). In this document he argued that "racially foreign, racially degenerate, racially incurable or seriously defective juveniles" should be sent to juvenile centres or correctional education centres and segregated from those who are "German and racially valuable".

Freisler strongly advocated the creation of laws to punish Rassenschande ("race defilement", the Nazi term for sexual relations between "Aryans" and "inferior races"), to be classed as "racial treason". Freisler looked to racist laws in the United States states as a model for Nazi legislation to target Jews in Germany. Freisler considered Jim Crow racist legislation "primitive" for failing to provide a legal definition of the term black or negro person. While some more conservative Nazi lawyers objected to the lack of precision with which a person could be defined as a "Jew," he argued that American judges were able to identify black people for purposes of laws in American states that prohibited "miscegenation" between black and white people and laws that otherwise codified racial segregation and German laws could similarly target Jews even if the term "Jew" could not be given a precise legal definition.

In 1933, Freisler published a pamphlet calling for the legal prohibition of "mixed-blood" sexual intercourse, which met with expressions of public unease in the dying elements of the German free press and non-Nazi political classes and lacked public authorization from the policy of the Nazi Party, which had only just obtained dictatorial control of the state. It also led to a clash with his superior Franz Gürtner but Freisler's ideological views reflected things to come, as was shown by the enactment of the Nuremberg Laws within two years.

In October 1939, Freisler introduced the concept of 'precocious juvenile criminal' in the "Juvenile Felons Decree". This "provided the legal basis for imposing the death penalty and penitentiary terms on juveniles for the first time in German legal history". Between 1933 and 1945, the Reich's courts sentenced at least 72 German juveniles to death, among them 17-year-old Helmuth Hübener, found guilty of high treason for distributing anti-war leaflets in 1942.

On the outbreak of World War II, Freisler issued a legal "Decree against National Parasites" (September 1939) introducing the term "perpetrator type", which was used in combination with another Nazi ideological term, "parasite". The adoption of racial biological terminology into law portrayed juvenile criminality as "parasitical", implying the need for harsher sentences to remedy it. He justified the new concept with: "in times of war, breaches of loyalty and baseness cannot find any leniency and must be met with the full force of the law".

On 8 July 1940, the Justice Ministry received a written complaint from Lothar Kreyssig, a senior local court judge protesting against the killings, described by the Nazi régime, of physically or mentally disabled persons including multiple individuals under the local judge's wardship. Freisler met with the local judge and explained that the ministry was in the process of establishing orderly procedures for the program with "expert committees" and "grievance councils"; notably, despite the absence thus far of promulgated procedures for adjudications under and implementation of the program, Freisler did not dispute the legality of the killings, instead arguing that the Nazi state had brought about a new concept of law. The local judge continued to protest, and some months later, after a second meeting with Reichsminister Gürtner reinforced Freisler's position, the local judge was forced to retire.

On 31 October 1941, Freisler issued a directive that Jewish inmates had to wear the identifying yellow badge in Reich prisons. He also worked closely with the Reichsstatthalter of Reichsgau Wartheland, Arthur Greiser, on standardizing penalties for Jews and Poles in the occupied eastern territories. They concluded that the death penalty or concentration camp imprisonment, imposed by special courts-martial, were the only acceptable punishments for these categories of individuals, even for minor offenses. These penal regulations came into force in December 1941, and also were applied to Jews who were transported into the eastern territories.

== Wannsee Conference ==
On 20 January 1942, Freisler, representing Acting Reichsminister of Justice Franz Schlegelberger, attended the Wannsee Conference of senior governmental officials in a villa on the southwestern outskirts of Berlin to provide expert legal advice for the planning of the destruction of European Jewry. The official minutes of the conference do not record any comments by Freisler; he had a history of antisemitism and knowledge of the regime's use of extrajudicial killing in other contexts and was certainly aware that the purpose of the meeting was to discuss the extermination of the Jews.

== Presidency of the People's Court ==
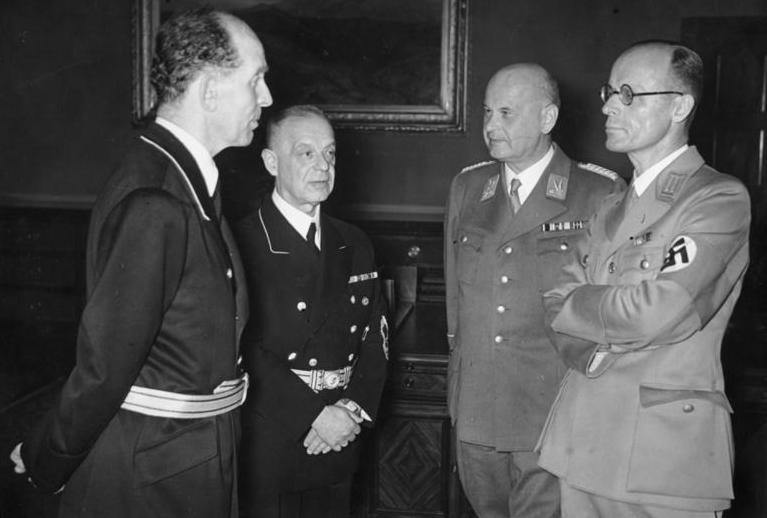
A meeting of the four Nazis who imposed Nazi ideology on the legal system of Germany. From left to right: Roland Freisler, Franz Schlegelberger, Otto Georg Thierack and Curt Rothenberger.

On 20 August 1942, Hitler promoted Otto Georg Thierack to Reich Justice Minister, replacing the retiring Schlegelberger, and named Freisler to succeed Thierack as president of the People's Court (Volksgerichtshof). This court had jurisdiction over a broad array of political offences, including black marketeering, work slowdowns and defeatism. These actions were viewed by Freisler as Wehrkraftzersetzung (undermining defensive capability) and were punished severely, with many death sentences. The People's Court under Freisler's domination almost always sided with the prosecuting authority, to the point that being brought before it was tantamount to a capital charge. Its separate administrative existence beyond the ordinary judicial system, despite its trappings, rapidly turned it into an executive execution arm and psychological domestic terror weapon of the regime, in the tradition of a revolutionary tribunal rather than a court of law.

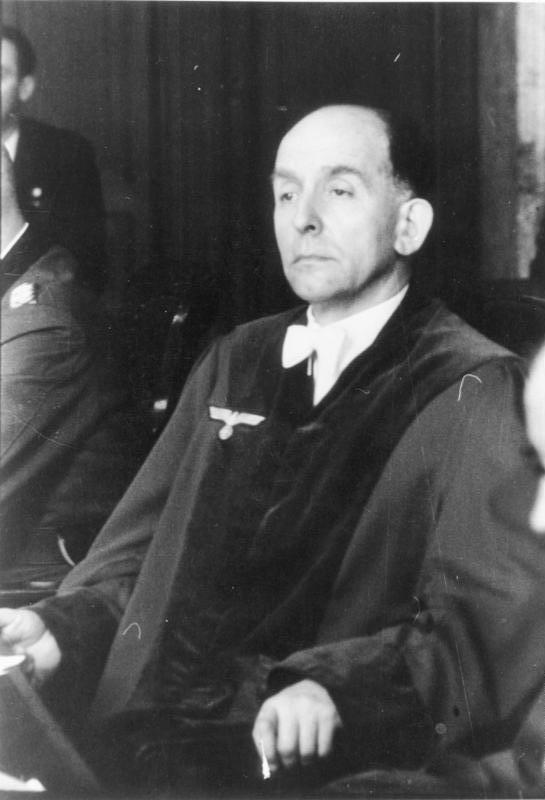
Freisler in 1944

Freisler chaired the First Senate of the People's Court wearing a blood-scarlet judicial robe, in a hearing chamber bedecked with scarlet swastika-draped banners and a large black sculpted bust of Adolf Hitler's head upon a high pedestal behind his chair, opening each hearing session with the Nazi salute from the bench. He acted as prosecutor, judge, and jury combined, and also as his own recorder, thereby controlling the record of the written grounds for the sentences that he passed.

The frequency of death sentences rose sharply under Freisler's rule. Approximately 90% of all cases that came before him ended in guilty verdicts. Between 1942 and 1945, more than 5,000 death sentences were decreed by him, 2,600 of these through the court's First Senate, which Freisler controlled. He was responsible in his three years on the court for as many death sentences as all other senate sessions of the court combined in the court's existence between 1934 and 1945.

Freisler became known during this period for berating each member of the steady stream of defendants passing before him. He was known to be interested in Andrey Vyshinsky, the Chief Prosecutor of the Soviet purge trials and had attended those show trials to watch Vyshinsky's courtroom performances in a similar capacity in Moscow in 1938.

== White Rose show-trials ==
On 18 February 1943, Sophie Scholl and Hans Scholl were captured by the Gestapo. Through questioning, it became clear that the two siblings were part of a resistance group called the White Rose that was attempting to sow discord in Germany by the use of mailing pamphlets urging passive resistance. A third resistance member, Christoph Probst was soon arrested. On 22 February 1943, Freisler was flown into Munich for the sole purpose of presiding over their trial. The verdict was as expected, guilty. Freisler sentenced the three to death by hanging but fearful of them being raised to martyrdom status if they were publicly killed, it was decided to execute them by guillotine instead. On 19 April 1943, Freisler was flown back again to stand as judge over the second trial of the White Rose members. Out of the thirteen defendants, three were sentenced to death, nine were given prison sentences and one was acquitted.

== 20 July Plot show-trials ==
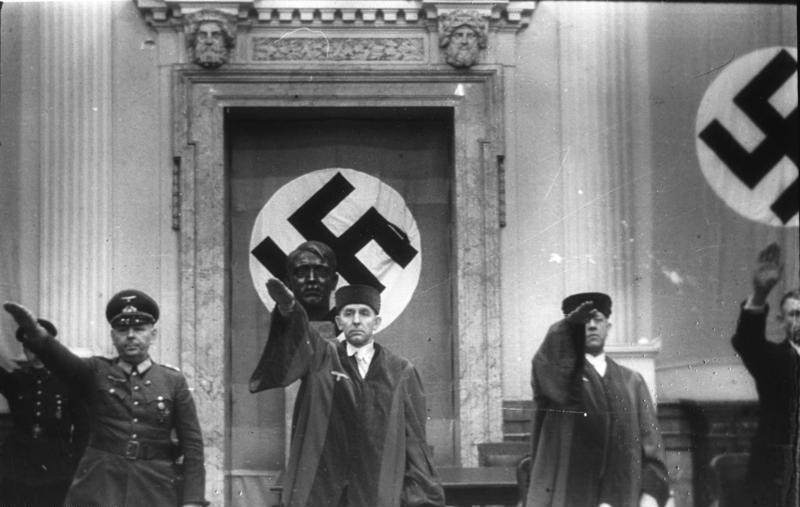
1944 Freisler presiding over the German People's Court with Hermann Reinecke at left and at right, Oberreichsanwalt Ernst Lautz

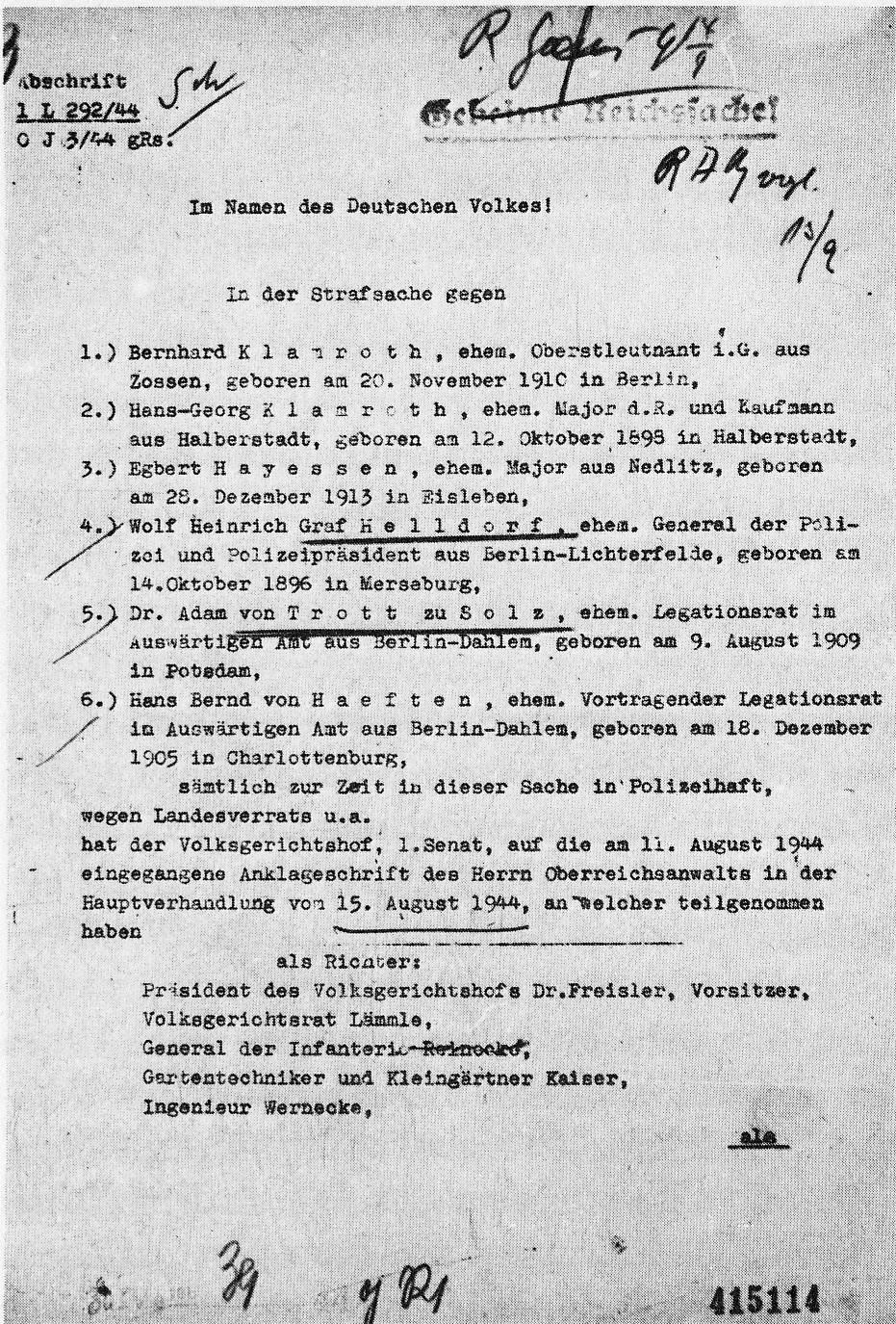
Criminal case against six defendants in the 20 July 1944 plot in the German People's Court, presided over by Judge Roland Freisler, who were tried and executed 15 August 1944

In August 1944, some of the arrested perpetrators of the 20 July Plot against Adolf Hitler were brought before Freisler for punishment. The proceedings were filmed to be shown to the German public in cinema newsreels, and show how Freisler ran his court. He would often alternate between questioning the defendants in an analytical manner, then suddenly launch into a tirade, even going so far as to shout insults at the accused from the bench. The shift from cold, clinical interrogation to fits of screaming rage was designed to psychologically disarm, torment and humiliate those on trial while discouraging any attempt on their part to defend or justify their actions. At one point, Freisler yelled at Field Marshal Erwin von Witzleben, who was trying to hold up his trousers after being purposely given old, oversized and beltless clothing: "You dirty old man, why do you keep fiddling with your trousers?"

Another instance is from Freisler's public appearance during the trial of the defendant Ulrich-Wilhelm Graf Schwerin von Schwanenfeld. The footage taken shows Freisler drowning out Schwerin's weak and muted testimony, prompted by his concern over the Wehrmacht's "numerous murders in Poland", by roaring at him in an exaggerated and theatrical manner, declaring "Sie sind ja ein schäbiger Lump!" (roughly, "You really are a lousy piece of trash!"). Nearly all of the accused were sentenced to death by hanging, with some of the sentences being carried out within two hours of the verdict being delivered.

These trials were held in the plenary or great hall of the Berlin main court or Kammergericht in Schoneburg, there is a memorial in the room where the show-trials took place.

== Death ==
On the morning of 3 February 1945, Freisler was conducting a Saturday session of the People's Court when United States Army Air Forces bombers attacked Berlin, led by the B-17 of Lieutenant Colonel Robert Rosenthal. Government and Nazi Party buildings were hit, including the Reich Chancellery, the Gestapo headquarters, the Party Chancellery and the People's Court. Hearing the air raid sirens, Freisler hastily adjourned the court and ordered that the prisoners be taken to an air raid shelter but he stayed behind to gather files before leaving.

A bomb struck the court building at 11:08, causing a partial internal collapse and a masonry column came crashing down on Freisler, crushing and killing him instantly. A large portion of the courtroom also landed on Freisler's corpse. The flattened remains of Freisler were found beneath the rubble still clutching the files he had stopped to retrieve. Among the files was that of Fabian von Schlabrendorff, a bomb plotter who was on trial that day and facing execution.

A differing account stated that Freisler "was killed by a bomb fragment while trying to escape from his law court to the air-raid shelter" and that he "bled to death on the pavement outside the People's Court at Bellevuestrasse 15 in Berlin". Schlabrendorff was "standing near Freisler when the latter met his end". (Note: Freisler's death saved Schlabrendorff, who after the war became a judge of the Constitutional Court of the Federal Republic of Germany (Bundesverfassungsgericht).) Schlabrendorff was re-tried and acquitted, and survived the war, ultimately following Freisler as a judge, on the Federal Constitutional Court.

A foreign correspondent reported, "Apparently nobody regretted his death." Luise Jodl, wife of General Alfred Jodl, recounted more than 25 years later that she had been working at the Lützow Hospital when Freisler's body was brought in, and that a worker commented it was "God's verdict". According to Mrs. Jodl, "Not one person said a word in reply." His body was buried in the grave of his wife's family at the Waldfriedhof Dahlem Cemetery in Berlin. His name is not recorded on the gravestone.

== Personal life ==
Freisler married Marion Russegger on 24 March 1928; the couple had two sons, Harald and Roland.

== Freisler in film and fiction ==
Freisler appears in fictional form in the Hans Fallada novel Every Man Dies Alone (1947). In 1943, he tried and handed down death penalties to Otto and Elise Hampel, who were both guillotined for distributing anti-Nazi postcards and whose true story inspired Fallada's novel. In the novel Fatherland (1992) by Robert Harris, which takes place in an alternate 1964 in which Nazi Germany won World War II, Freisler is mentioned as having survived until winter 1954, when he is killed by a maniac with a knife on the steps of the Berlin People's Court. It is implied that his death was actually caused by the Gestapo, to ensure that the Wannsee Conference and the Holocaust remained a secret.

Freisler has been portrayed by screen actors at least eight times, by Rainer Steffen in the German television film Die Wannseekonferenz (1984), by Roland Schäfer in the Anglo-French-German film Reunion (1989), by Brian Cox in the British television film Witness Against Hitler (1996), by Owen Teale in the BBC–HBO film Conspiracy (2001), by André Hennicke in the film Sophie Scholl – The Final Days (2005), by Helmut Stauss in the film Valkyrie (2008) by Karl Knaup in Rommel (2012, uncredited) and by Arnd Klawitter in the German television film Die Wannseekonferenz (2022).

== See also ==
- Carl Schmitt – German jurist and political philosopher (1888–1985)
- Günther Vollmer – Nazi jurist
- Hanging judge – Judge who hands down harsh sentences
- Hans Frank – German politician and war criminal (1900–1946)
- Harry Haffner – German lawyer and judge (1900-1969)
- Helmuth James Graf von Moltke – German resistance member (1907–1945)
- Kangaroo court – Court with little or no judicial credibility
- Robert Rosenthal – United States Army Air Forces officer

== Bibliography ==
- Bartrop, Paul R. & Grimm, Eve E. "Perpetrating the Holocaust: Leaders, Enablers, and Collaborators" ABC-CLIO, 2019, pages 93–95, ISBN 978-1-440-85896-3.
- Breuning, Stephan. Roland Freisler: Rechtsideologien im III. Reich. Neuhegelianismus kontra Hegel ("Legal ideologies in the Third Reich. Neo-Hegelianism contra Hegel") Hamburg, Kovac 2002, ISBN 3-8300-0667-5.
- Buchheit, Gert. Richter in roter Robe. Freisler, Präsident des Volksgerichtshofes ("Judges in Red Robes. Freisler, President of the People's Court") München, 1968.
- Geerling, Wayne. "Protecting the National Community From Juvenile Delinquency: Nazification of Juvenile Criminal Law in the Third Reich", a chapter from the author's dissertation Resistance as High Treason: Juvenile Resistance in the Third Reich, Melbourne University, 2001. Read it here
- Klee, Ernst (2007). Das Personenlexikon zum Dritten Reich. Wer war was vor und nach 1945. Frankfurt-am-Main: Fischer-Taschenbuch-Verlag. ISBN 978-3-596-16048-8.
- Knopp, Guido. Hitler's Hitmen (Ch. 4, "The Hanging Judge"). Stroud, UK: Sutton Publishing, 2002.
- Koch, H. W. In the Name of the Volk: Political Justice in Hitler's Germany London, 1989.
- Lilla, Joachim (2005). Der Preußische Staatsrat 1921–1933: Ein biographisches Handbuch. Düsseldorf: Droste Verlag. ISBN 978-3-770-05271-4.
- Miller, Michael D.; Schulz, Andreas (2012). Gauleiter: The Regional Leaders of the Nazi Party and Their Deputies, 1925–1945 (Herbert Albrecht – H. Wilhelm Hüttmann). Vol. I. R. James Bender Publishing. ISBN 978-1-932-97021-0.
- Ortner, Helmut. Der Hinrichter. Roland Freisler, Mörder im Dienste Hitlers ("The Executioner. Roland Freisler, Murderer in Hitler's Service") Wien, Zsolnay 1993, ISBN 3-552-04504-X.
- Struck, Silke (2017). "Roland Freisler, Reich Ministry of Justice: Hitler's "Political Soldier"". In Jasch, Hans-Christian; Kreutzmüller, Christoph (eds.). The Participants: The Men of the Wannsee Conference. New York: Berghahn Books. ISBN 978-1-785-33671-3.

Legal offices
Preceded by Otto Georg Thierack	Judge President of the People's Court; 20 August 1942 – 3 February 1945	Succeeded by Harry Haffner
