= Harry Haffner =

German lawyer and judge (1900-1969)

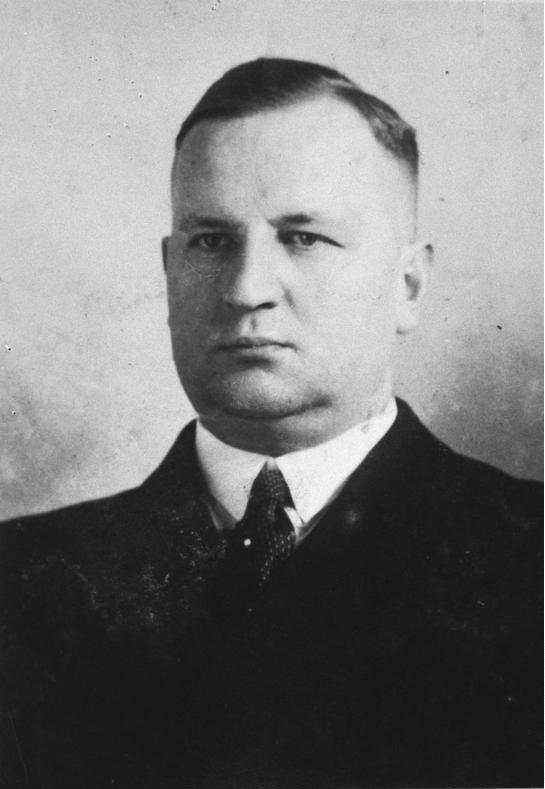

Judge President of the People's Court
- In office 12 March 1945 – 24 April 1945
- Preceded by: Wilhelm Crohne (acting); Roland Freisler
- Succeeded by: Position abolished

General Prosecutor of Katowice
- In office 1 January 1944 – March 1945

Chief of Staff at the National Socialist Association of Legal Professionals
- In office Late 1933 – 1934

Personal details
- Born: 27 May 1900; Uslar, Lower Saxony
- Died: 14 October 1969; Hornberg, West Germany (aged 69)

Harry Haffner (28 May 1900 – 14 October 1969) was a German lawyer and the last Judge-President of the Nazi People's Court.

Haffner was born in Uslar, Lower Saxony. He graduated in law in 1926 and worked as a prosecutor. He joined the Nazi Party and SA on 1 May 1933. Haffner was then chief of staff at the National Socialist Association of Legal Professionals and Zellenleiter of the NSV. In 1934, he was appointed a prosecutor in Celle, and in 1936 he was appointed senior prosecutor to the Prosecutor General of Kassel. In 1938, he was a representative of the General Prosecutor in Hamm. On 1 January 1944, Haffner became the General Prosecutor of Katowice in occupied Poland where the Auschwitz concentration camp fell within his remit – he visited the camp on 28 June 1944.

On 12 March 1945, following the death of Roland Freisler in an air raid, he succeeded him as the last judge-president of the Volksgerichtshof (People's Court). He held this office until 24 April 1945 when the court finally ceased its activity only two weeks before the German surrender.

From 1946 he lived under the name of Heinrich Hartmann in the town of Sontra, where he ran a shop with his wife. In 1953, he turned himself in to the authorities in Kassel and the prosecutor made his past public, but the investigations against him were dismissed. He died in Hornberg, aged 69.

== Sources ==
- Koch, Hanns Joachim Wolfgang (1997). In the name of the Volk: political justice in Hitler's Germany. I.B.Tauris. pp. 226, 227. ISBN 1-86064-174-1.

Legal offices
Preceded by Roland Freisler	Judge President of the People's Court; 12 March – 24 April 1945	Succeeded by position abolished
