= Stannah Lifts =

Elevator manufacturer

Stannah Lifts Holdings Ltd
- Type: Private
- Industry: Elevators
- Founded: London, England (1867; 159 years ago)
- Headquarters: Andover, Hampshire, England
- Area served: Worldwide
- Key people: Alan Stannah; Chairman; Brian Stannah (Chairman); Jon Stannah (Managing director)
- Products: Stairlifts; Passenger lifts Platform lifts Escalators; Moving walkways Dumb waiters (microlifts)
- Services: Maintenance, repair, and operations
- Revenue: GBP 256,426,000 (2021)
- Number of employees: 2700 (2023)
- Subsidiaries: Stannah Stairlifts; Stannah Microlifts; Stannah Lift Services
- Website: corporate.stannah.com

Stannah Lifts Holdings Ltd is a provider of lifts, escalators and moving walkways and manufacturer of stairlifts and platform lifts. The headquarters are in Andover, Hampshire, England. The company makes various commercial lifts, but it is known for its stairlifts.

The company headquarters and factory is on the Portway Industrial Estate on the western outskirts of Andover. It also operates a factory in Newburn, near Newcastle-upon-Tyne.

== History ==
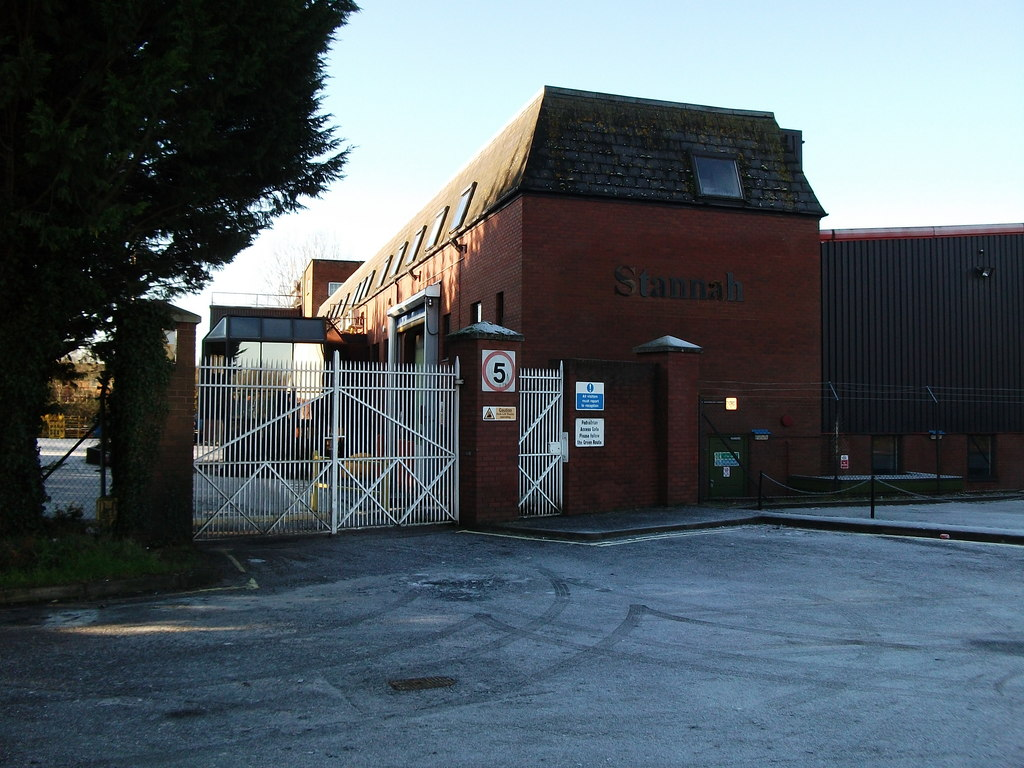
Headquarters in Andover, UK

Joseph Stannah founded the company in London in 1867. Initially a manufacturer of cranes and hoists for transporting ships' cargo, the company began to make hand-powered passenger lifts at the turn of the 20th century. Its first headquarters were on Southwark Bridge Road, before moving to Bankside in the early 20th century. The company remained here until the site was destroyed during the London Blitz. Leslie Stannah, the chairman at the time, built new headquarters at Tiverton Street, Southwark using compensation money awarded to the company.

Stannah Lifts moved from London to Andover in 1974, produced its first stairlift in 1975, and began exporting in 1979. From there, it established itself as the leading manufacturer of stairlifts worldwide, as well as Britain's largest lift manufacturer.

== Products ==
=== Stairlifts and homelifts ===
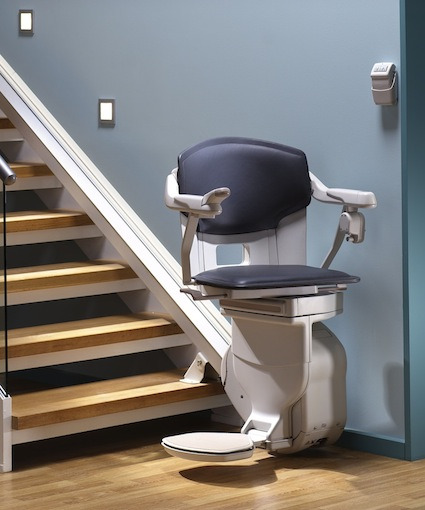
Stannah stairlift

The company's stairlift division manufactures new stairlifts as well as reconditioning old units. Models are produced for both straight, curved and external staircases, with all units using a rail fitted to the stair tread.

=== Commercial lifts ===
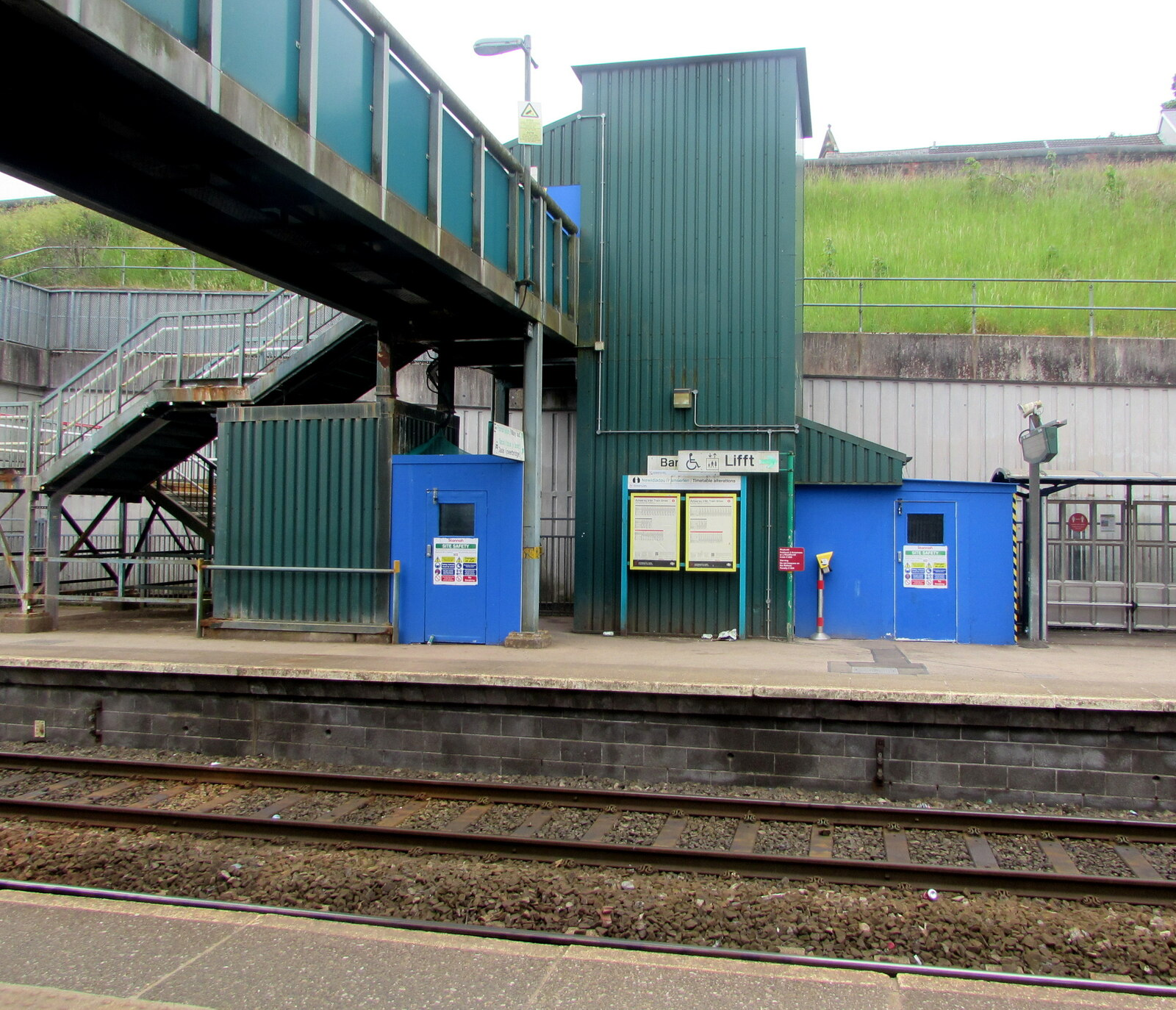
Stannah lifts at Bargoed railway station, Wales

Stannah is a supplier of lift products, including passenger and platform lifts, goods and service lifts, escalators, and moving walkways for all types of buildings. It also provides maintenance and repair services.

Stannah imports and installs lifts and escalators from brands in other countries.

== Corporate ==
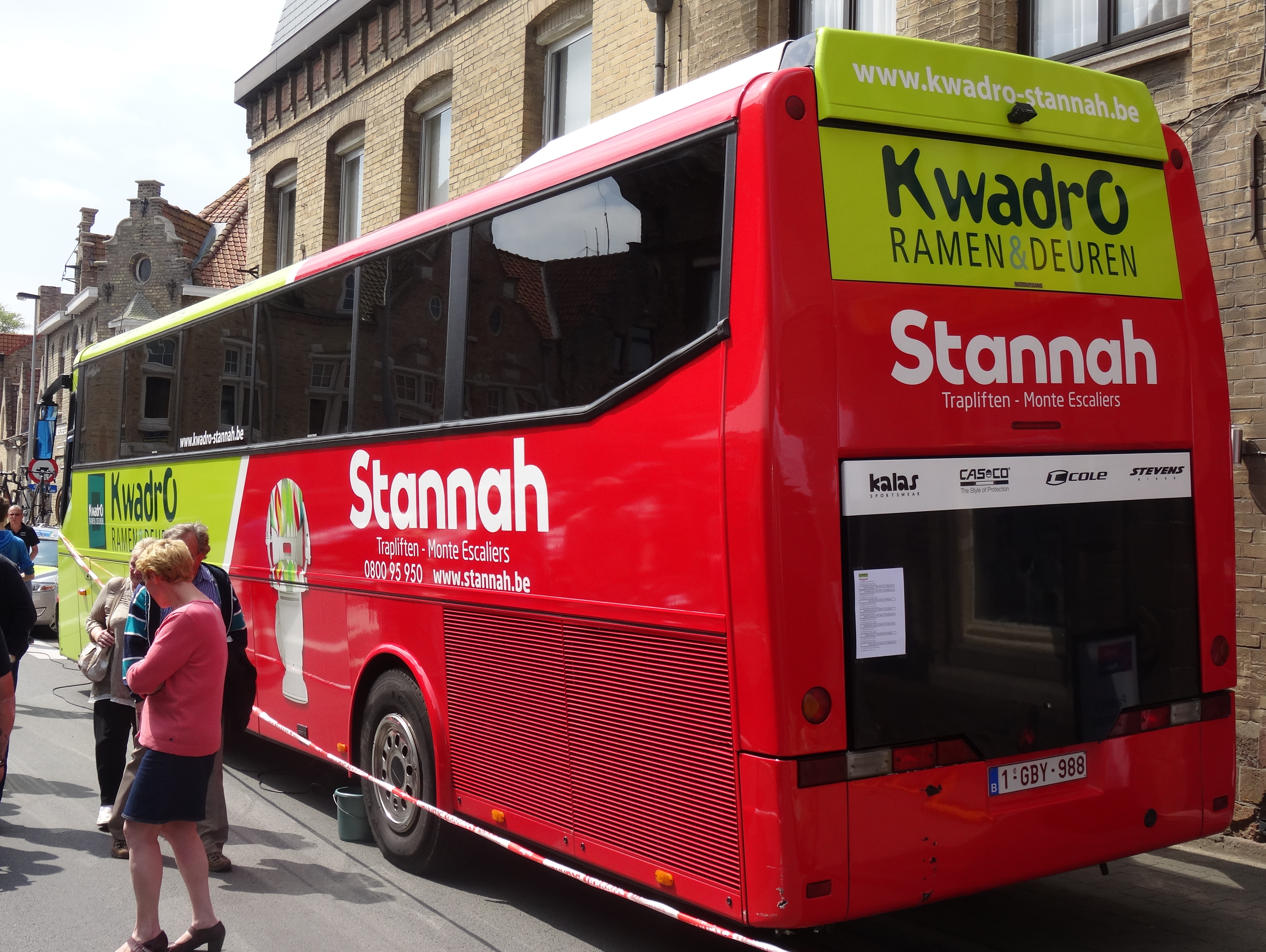
Kwadro-Stannah cycle racing team at the Tour of Belgium cycling race, 2014

Since its foundation, the company has remained a family-run business. At present, six fifth-generation members of the family maintain a 100% shareholding in the company. Stannah Lifts was officially incorporated as a Private Limited Company in March 1961. In December 2022, the company reported an annual turnover of £116,384,000 and a profit of £32,946,000. It was formerly a sponsor of the Kwadro-Stannah cycling team.

== See also ==
- List of elevator manufacturers
