= Marshall Elevator =

Elevator manufacturer

Marshall Elevator was the oldest elevator company in the United States. It was founded in 1818 by John Marshall. Marshall & Son originally was a Blacksmith, but in the 1840s, they started to produce elevators of all kinds. In 1942, they began to sell elevator products by the Rotary Lift Company, which, in 1955, merged with other companies and changed their name to the Dover Elevator Division. In 1999, they became a reseller of ThyssenDover Elevators, the company that was formed after the merger of Dover Elevator and Thyssen Elevator. By 2001, they stopped installing ThyssenDover elevators, due to another name change to ThyssenKrupp Elevator.

On July 26, 2011, after 193 years and nine generations, the family that owned Marshall Elevator sold the company to Otis Elevator Company. The terms of the acquisition were not disclosed. They stopped reselling ThyssenKrupp products due to ThyssenKrupp and Otis being competitors.

== See also ==
- List of elevator manufacturers
