= Anton Freissler =

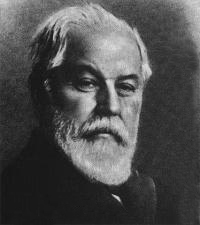
- Born: 13 March 1838; Kujavy, Moravia, Austrian Empire
- Died: 29 February 1916 (aged 77); Hinterbrühl, Austria-Hungary
- Engineering career
- Projects: elevators

Anton Freissler (also spelled Anton Freißler; 13 March 1838 – 29 February 1916) was an Austrian technician, industrialist and politician. He invented and developed a number of elevators including paternosters.

== Biography ==
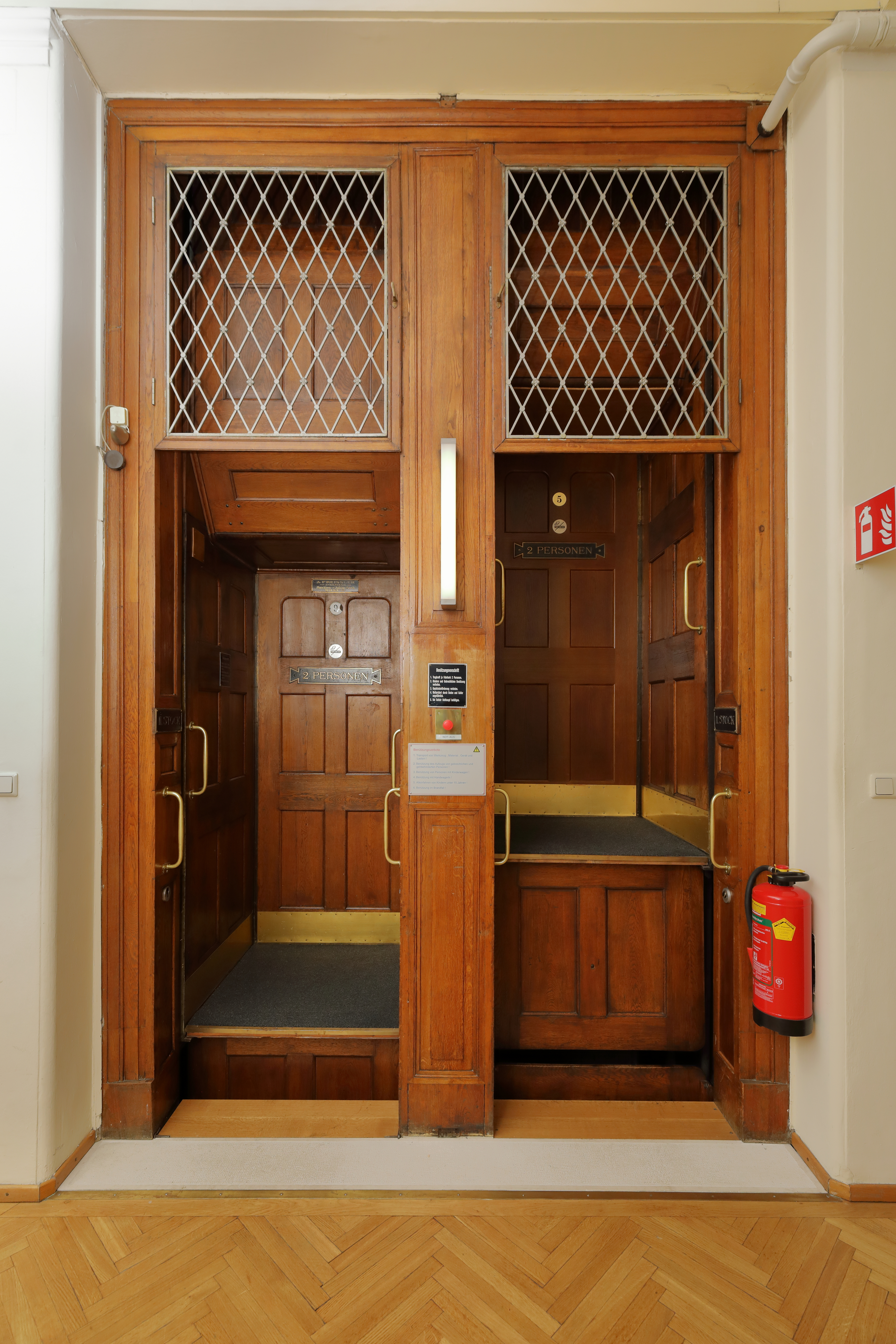
Oldest Paternoster in Austria by Freissler, installed in 1911

Freissler was born on 13 March 1838 in Kujavy in northern Moravia, which was a part of the Austrian Empire. Freissler developed paternosters and other elevators, which were sold very successfully throughout the empire and abroad. One of the oldest paternosters, installed in 1911, is still in use in the House of Industry in Vienna.

Freissler was also issued an imperial warrant as a Purveyor to the Imperial and Royal Court.

The company existed until the 1970s until it was incorporated into Otis Austria.

== See also ==
- List of elevator manufacturers
