= Marion Freisler =

Spouse of Roland Freisler (1910–1997)

- Born: Marion Russegger; February 10, 1910; Hamburg
- Died: January 27, 1997 (aged 86)
- Known for: Wife of Roland Freisler
- Spouse: Roland Freisler
- Children: 2

Marion Freisler (née Russegger; 10 February 1910 – 21 January 1997) was the wife of Roland Freisler, the infamous judge and chairman of the Nazi Volksgerichtshof (People's Court), who died in 1945 during an air raid in Berlin. She is sometimes mistakenly referred to as Anna Freisler.

== Life ==
Marion Russegger was born 10 February 1910 in Hamburg, the daughter of Bernhard Adolf Cajetan Russegger, a merchant in Hamburg and Bremen, and Cornelia Pirscher. On 24 March 1928, she married Roland Freisler, who was a lawyer and city councillor of the Nazi Party in Kassel at the time. They had two sons, Harald and Roland, and both were baptized. On 3 February 1945, her husband was killed during an Allied air raid in Berlin. In his will, dated 1 October 1944, Freisler had decreed that their two houses belonged to his wife. She was considered "not incriminated" by the decision of the tribunal of April 29, 1953 and was his universal heir. She never remarried and, after the war, resumed her birth name Russegger and moved to Munich.

In 1974, her pension was raised by about 400 Deutsche Marks. According to the pension office, this was done because her husband would have led a successful career as a lawyer or a senior judge had he not been executed, disbarred, or imprisoned by the military tribunals of the Allied countries. A member of the Bavarian Landtag protested the decision, but the state government rejected the protest. This was one of the last incidents connected with the problematic issue of integrating National Socialist jurists in the early years of the Federal Republic of Germany. In 1985, there was a scandal about her and other well-pensioned survivors of high-ranking Nazi officials. In 1997, aged 86, Freisler died. She was buried in Berlin in the Russegger family plot alongside her parents and her husband (Roland Freisler's name is not on the gravestone).

== Bibliography ==
- Guido Knopp, Hitler's Hitmen, Sutton Publishing (2002), chapter "The Hanging Judge", pp. 213-251. ISBN 9780750926027
