= Oswald Freisler =

German lawyer

Oswald Freisler (29 December 1895 – 4 March 1939) was a lawyer in Nazi Germany and the younger brother of Roland Freisler, who a few years after Oswald's death became the Judge President of the People's Court.

== Life ==
Freisler attended the Gymnasium in Aachen and Kassel, where in 1914 he passed his Abitur. He studied law in Kiel, Frankfurt and Göttingen. In February 1924, he opened a law firm with his older brother Roland Freisler in Kassel. Oswald Freisler joined the Nazi Party in 1927 and was a member of the National Socialist Association of Legal Professionals. From 1933, he was Gauführer in Kassel and a member of the Academy for German Law, and in the same year, he became president of the bar association in Kassel. In 1936, he took over the Berlin office of Jewish lawyer Johannes Werthauer, who left Germany in 1933 in order to teach at the Sorbonne.

Although a Nazi, Freisler appeared as defence counsel in politically significant trials which the Nazis sought to use for propaganda purposes. He wore his Nazi Party badge in court, which led to confusion over the Party's role in the trials. In 1937, on behalf of the Catholic Church, Freisler took over the defence of three co-defendants in the trial of de:Joseph Cornelius Rossaint, a resistance fighter against National Socialism, and won an acquittal, much to the displeasure of the Nazi Party. In response, Joseph Goebbels asked Adolf Hitler to personally exclude Freisler from the party. On 30 April 1937, Goebbels observed with satisfaction, "Freisler expelled from the party by the Führer."

In 1939, Freisler mysteriously committed suicide in Berlin after he had been accused of irregularities in the conduct of a defence. There are three versions of Freisler's death. One is that he defenestrated himself from his office, another is that the incident occurred in prison, and the third version is that he injected himself with an overdose of insulin.

== Publications ==
- Das System der Ehrenstrafen in der deutschen Vergangenheit und im geltenden Recht und die Frage nach seiner Existenzberechtigung. Göttingen [1921], Law and political science dissertation from 1 November 1920

== Bibliography ==
- Gert Buchheit. Richter in roter Robe. Freisler, Präsident des Volksgerichtshofes. München: List, 1968; pp. 12–13, 276–278
- Short biography in: Werner Schubert, Werner Schmid, Jürgen Regge. Akademie für deutsches Recht, 1933-1945: Protokolle der Ausschüsse; Band 3, Familienrechtsausschuss, p. 43
