= Kujavy =

- Municipality
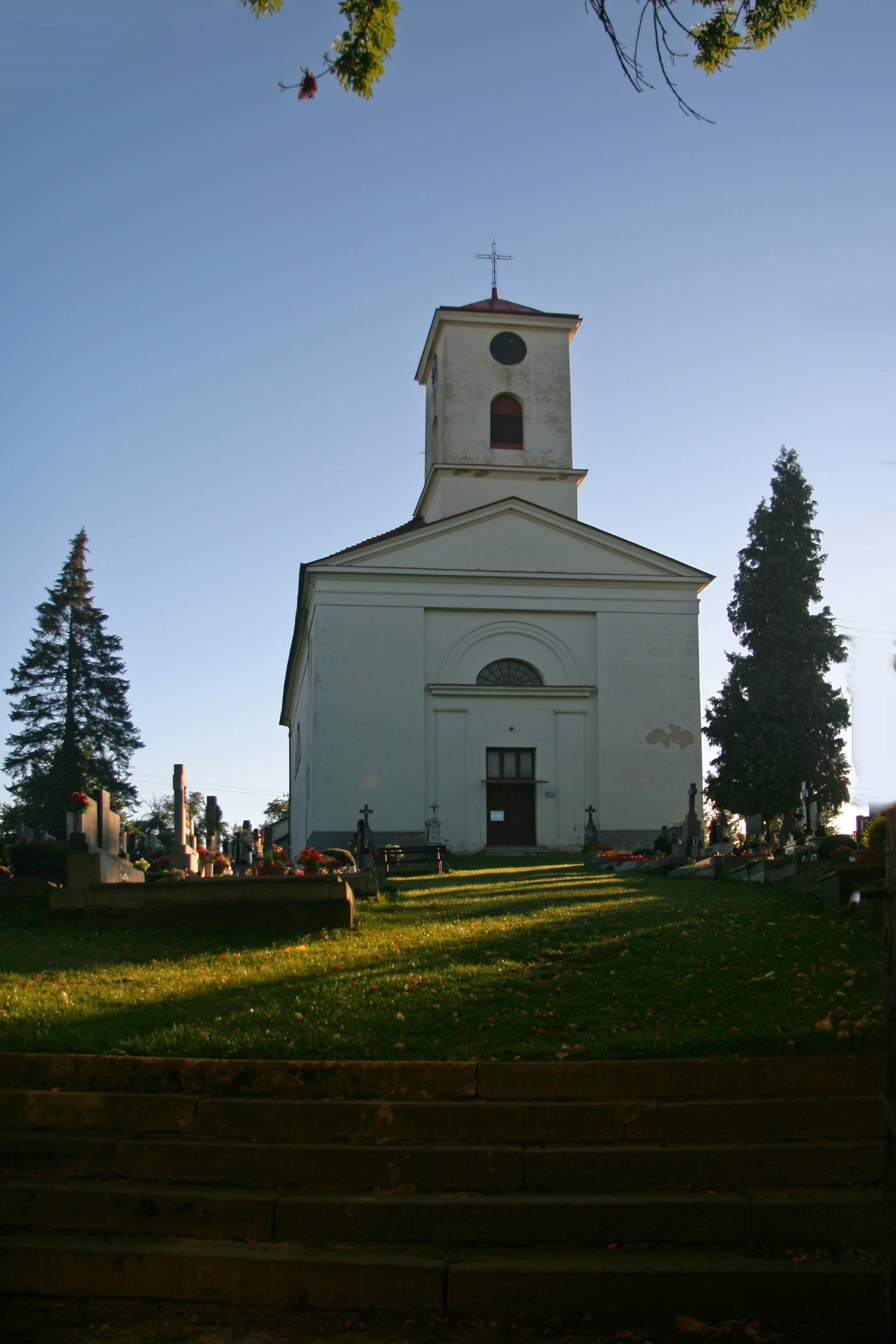
- Church of Saint Michael

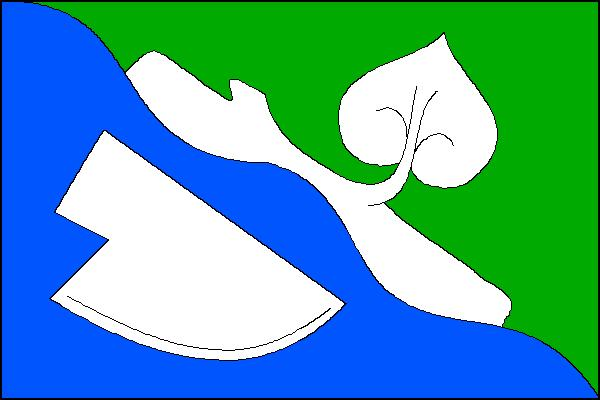
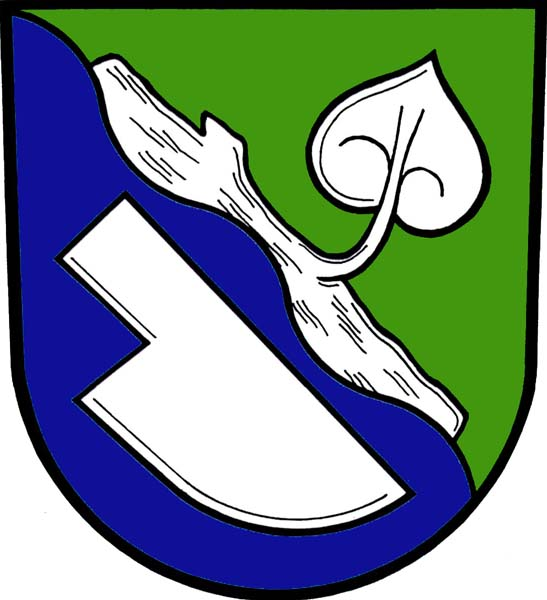
- Flag Coat of arms

- Location in the Czech Republic
- Coordinates: 49°42′12″N 17°58′21″E
- Country: Czech Republic
- Region: Moravian-Silesian
- District: Nový Jičín
- First mentioned: 1293

Government
  - Mayor: Michal Dresler (Za naše Kujavy)

Area
  - Total: 9.43 km^{2} (3.64 sq mi)
- Elevation: 258 m (846 ft)

Population (2026-01-01)
  - Total: 584
  - Density: 61.9/km^{2} (160/sq mi)
- Time zone: UTC+1 (CET)
  - Summer (DST): UTC+2 (CEST)
- Postal code: 742 45
- Website: www.kujavy.cz

Kujavy (German: Klantendorf) is a municipality and village in Nový Jičín District in the Moravian-Silesian Region of the Czech Republic. It has about 600 inhabitants.

== Demographics ==
Historical population
Year	Pop.	±%
1869	831	—
1880	888	+6.9%
1890	852	−4.1%
1900	827	−2.9%
1910	826	−0.1%
1921	785	−5.0%
1930	775	−1.3%
1950	533	−31.2%
1961	602	+12.9%
1970	555	−7.8%
1980	564	+1.6%
1991	517	−8.3%
2001	550	+6.4%
2011	548	−0.4%
2021	519	−5.3%
Source: Censuses

== Notable people ==
- Anton Freissler (1838–1916), Austrian industrialist and inventor
