= Aichi small-elevator manufacturing corporation =

Elevator manufacturer

- Company type: Kabushiki gaisha
- Industry: Vertical Transport Systems
- Founded: 1969; 57 years ago
- Headquarters: Aichi, Japan
- Products: Elevators and Dumbwaiter (elevator)s
- Website: www6.ocn.ne.jp/~ase/

The Aichi small-elevator manufacturing corporation is a manufacturer of vertical transportation systems, mainly elevators and Dumbwaiters. Founded in Aichi, Japan in 1969. Aichi small-elevator manufacturing corporation makes a speciality of small elevators, dumbwaiter and passenger lifts beside staircases.

== History ==
Aichi small-elevator manufacturing corporation was founded in 1969 under private management. It was organized in 1974 as a yugen kaisha and re-organized in 1976 as a kabushiki gaisha. The company moved to its present location in 1980.

== Products ==
- Elevators for passenger service.
- Stretcher capable elevators.
- Freight elevators.
- Hydraulic elevators.
- Dumbwaiter (elevator).
- Home elevators.
- Staircase passenger lift.
- Staircase wheelchair lift.
