= Wittur =

Elevator components company

Wittur Group
- Company type: Group of companies (GmbH)
- Industry: Elevator industry, component supplier
- Founded: 1968 in Germany
- Founder: Horst Wittur
- Headquarters: Sulzemoos - Wiedenzhausen, Germany
- Area served: Worldwide
- Products: Elevator components
- Brands: Wittur, Selcom, Sematic,
- Revenue: 950 M€ (2022)
- Website: wittur.com

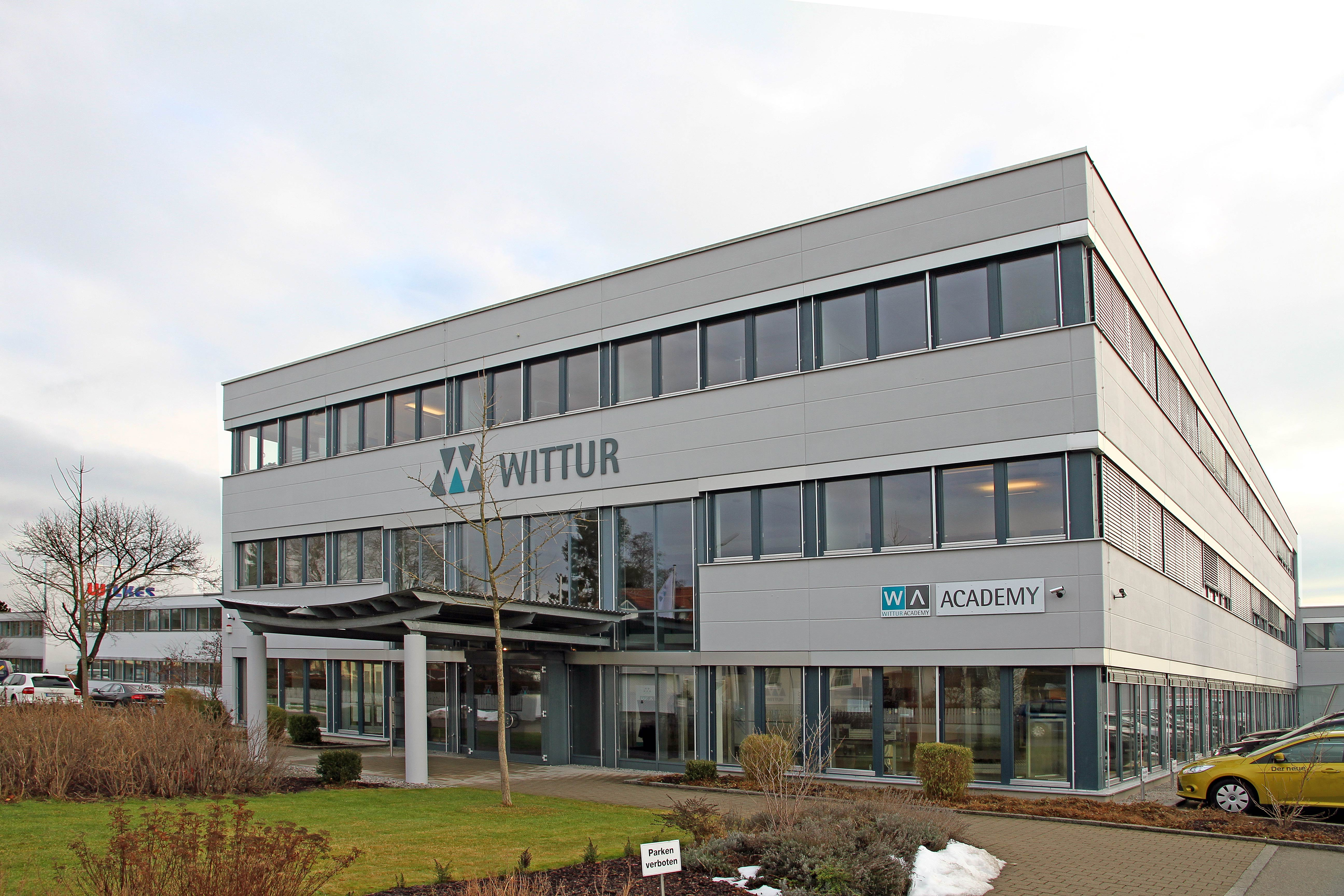
Wittur Group headquarters in Sulzemoos-Wiedenzhausen near Munich, Germany

The Wittur Group, with the operating entity Wittur Holding GmbH, is a worldwide leading producer and supplier of elevator components. Founded 1968 in Germany, the group is today present with various subsidiaries in Europe, Asia and Latin America. The headquarter is located in Sulzemoos - Wiedenzhausen, between Munich and Augsburg.

== History ==
Back in 1968, at the age of 26 Horst Wittur started the business by establishing 'Wittur Aufzugteile GmbH & Co.' in Sulzemoos - Wiedenzhausen. At first, the focus lay on the production of car doors as well as on trading with elevator components. However, in the course of company acquisitions and integrations the trade with externally produced elevator components was replaced by selling in-house produced parts. Even the international expansion had an early start. In 1977, the production plant Selcom S.p.A. (today Wittur S.p.A.) was established in Colorno, Italy, followed by the plant Selcom Aragon (today Wittur Elevator Components S.A.U.) in 1980 in Zaragoza, Spain. At the same time trade companies were introduced in countries such as the Netherlands, France, Australia and Hong Kong, and participations were acquired. In 1993, Wittur Turkey was established in Istanbul to provide products and services to the Eurasia region.

The first footprint in Asia was set in 1995 by establishing the subsidiary Suzhou Selcom (today Wittur Elevator Components (Suzhou)) in China. In the course of years the production plant in Suzhou, China was steadily enlarged and by now more than 650,000 elevator doors are produced there on a yearly basis (2013).

In 2000, Wittur gained a foothold on the South American continent by acquiring SOIMET (today Wittur S.A.) in Argentina and establishing Wittur Ltda. in Brazil. In the same year Wittur acquired the Kone door & cab facility at Strother Field, Winfield, Kansas, United States. The Winfield unit operated under the Selcom name, and later changed to Wittur. In 2004 the Winfield facility declared bankruptcy and was sold to John Mann.

Recent expansions concerning the production plants took place in 2009 in Krupina, Slovakia, and in 2010 in Chennai, India.

On August 12, 2015 Wittur announced the initiative to merge with Sematic, a group of companies active in the elevator components business.

On April 1, 2016 Wittur announced the successful closing of the Sematic Group acquisition.

In 2018, the year of its 50th anniversary, Wittur announces a global integrated management system certification encompassing all companies within WIttur Group.

In 2022, the first Wittur Group Sustainability report is published, with key targets for 2030.

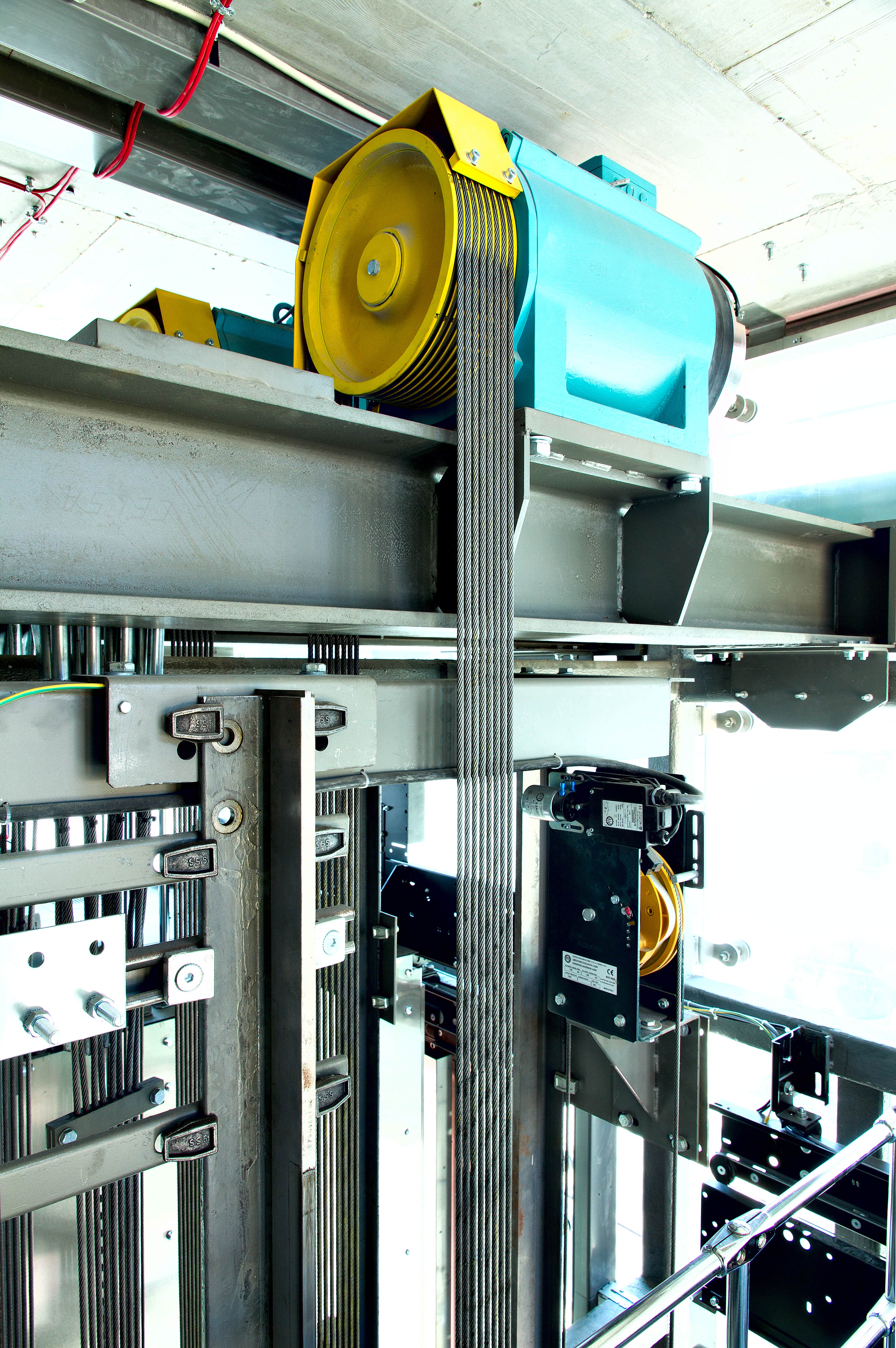
Gearless Drive in a Wittur MRL W-Line-Drive

== Products ==
Wittur started its business with the production of elevator doors only and has developed itself over time to an enterprise offering complete elevators and producing a wide range of elevator components such as:

- Elevator doors (car doors and landing doors)
- Lift machines
- Safety devices (especially overspeed governors and safety gears)
- Cars/Car slings
- Shaft accessories
- Complete elevator systems

== Research &Development (R&D) ==
The centers of competence for R&D are divided by products and located in the following way:

- Doors: Italy & China
- Elevator drives: Dresden, Germany
- Safety devices and shaft accessories: Scheibbs, Austria
- Cars/Car slings: Istanbul, Turkey
- Complete elevator systems: Istanbul, Turkey

In addition, Wittur has R&D facilities of different sizes in every single plant, starting from small test devices for doors in India through to test towers in Austria and Spain.
