= Otis Worldwide =

American elevator and escalator manufacturer

Otis Worldwide Corporation

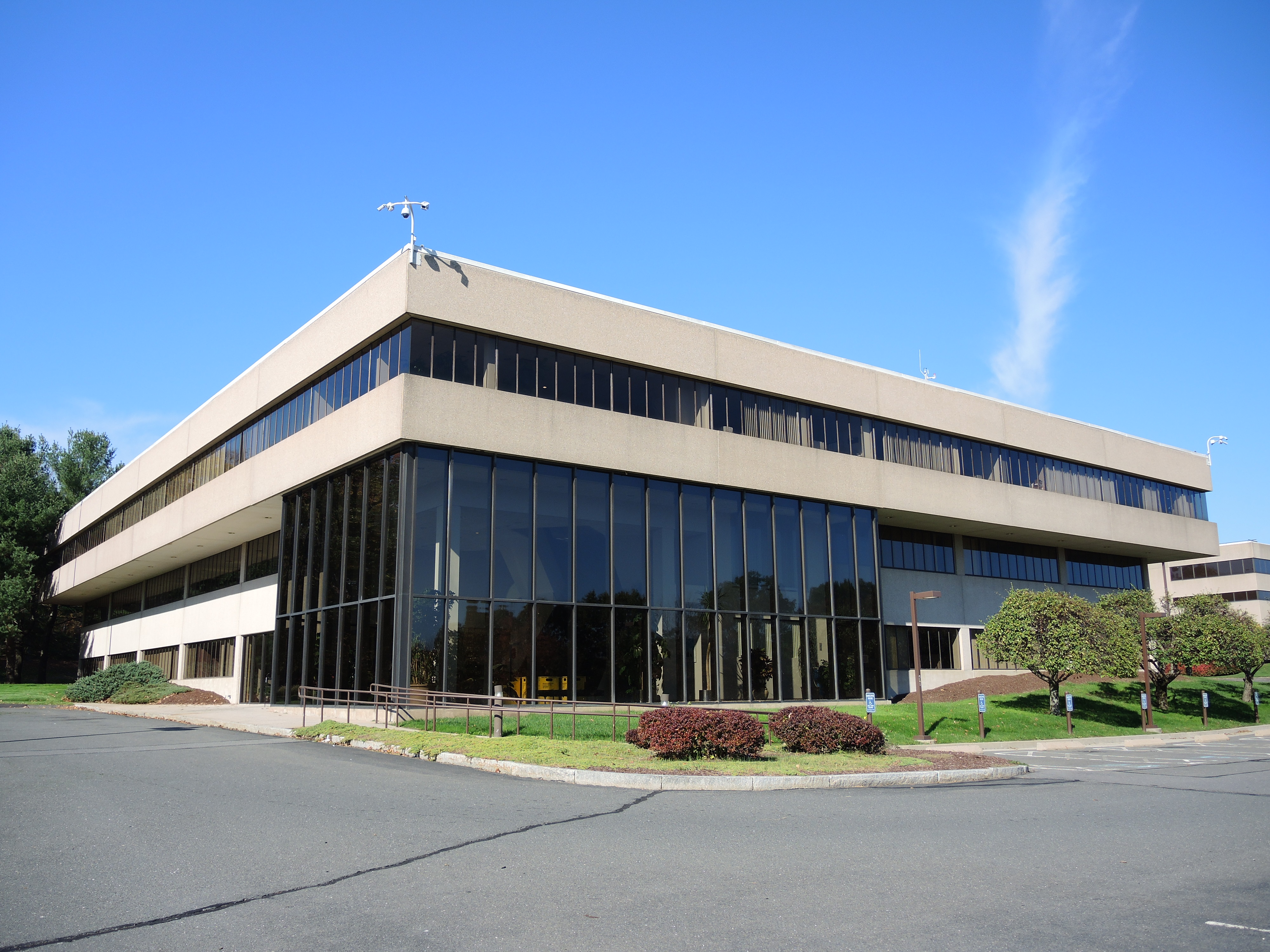
- Headquarters in Farmington, Connecticut
- Trade name: Otis Elevator Company
- Type: Public
- Traded as: NYSE: OTIS; S&P 500 component
- Industry: Transport systems
- Predecessor: United Technologies
- Founded: September 20, 1853; 173 years ago (acquired in 1976, spun off in 2020)
- Founder: Elisha Otis (original Otis Elevator Company)
- Headquarters: Farmington, Connecticut, U.S.
- Area served: Worldwide
- Key people: Judy Marks (chair, president and CEO)
- Products: Elevators and escalators
- Revenue: ▲US$14.4 billion (2025)
- Operating income: ▲US$2.13 billion (2025)
- Net income: ▼US$1.38 billion (2025)
- Total assets: ▼US$10.7 billion (2025)
- Total equity: ▼US$−5.4 billion (2025)
- Number of employees: 72,000 (2025)
- Website: otis.com

Otis Worldwide Corporation, doing business as its former legal name Otis Elevator Company and styled as OTIS, is an American company that develops, manufactures and markets elevators, escalators, moving walkways, and related equipment.

Based in Farmington, Connecticut, U.S., Otis is the world's largest manufacturer of vertical transportation systems, principally focusing on elevators, escalators, and moving walkways. It currently has a market share of 18%. The company pioneered the development of the "safety elevator", invented by Elisha Otis in 1852, which used a special mechanism that locked the elevator car in place against hoisting rope failure.

The Otis Elevator Company was acquired by United Technologies in 1976, and was spun off as an independent company 44 years later in April 2020.

== History ==
=== The booming elevator market ===
In 1852, Elisha Otis invented the safety elevator, which was automatically halted in a hoisting rope failure. After a demonstration at the 1853 New York World's Fair, the elevator industry established credibility.

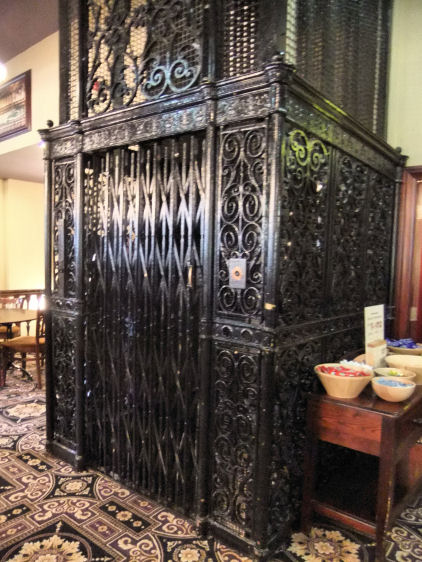
Otis elevator in Glasgow, Scotland, imported from the U.S. in 1856 for Gardner's Warehouse, the oldest cast-iron fronted building in the British Isles

Otis founded the Otis Elevator Company in Yonkers, New York, in 1853. When he died in 1861 his sons Charles and Norton formed a partnership and continued the business. During the American Civil War, Otis elevators were in high demand throughout the United States due to the shipment of war materials. In 1864, with the partnership of J.M. Alvord, the company became known as Otis Brothers & Co. In 1867, Otis opened a factory in Yonkers.

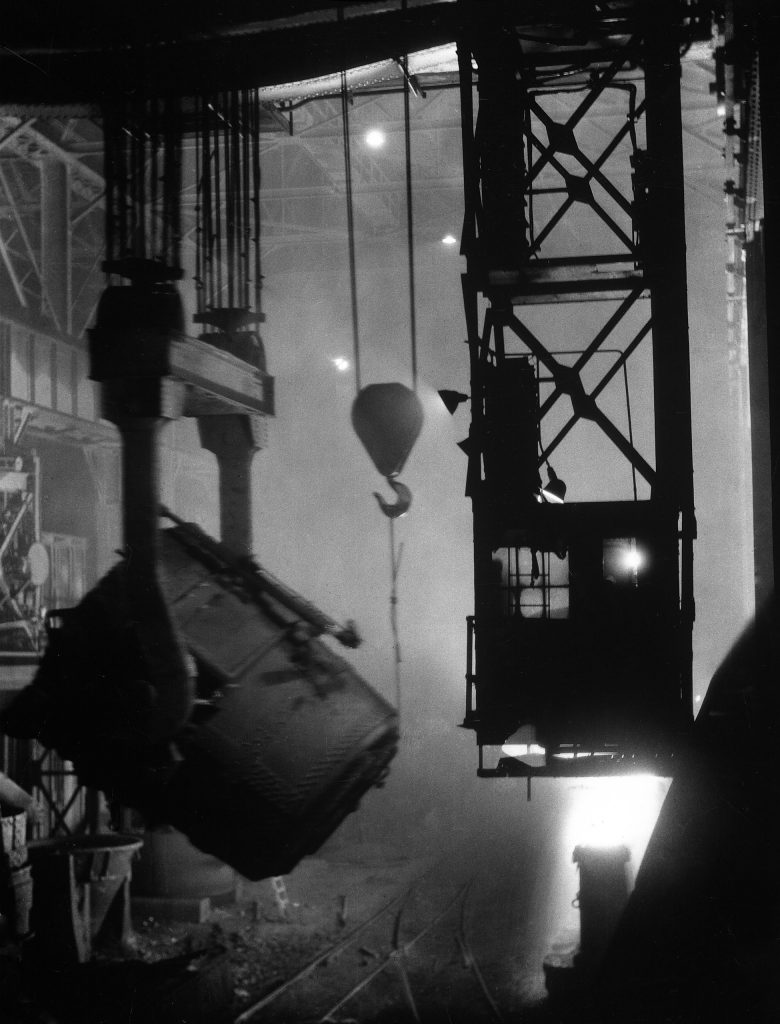
Otis Steel Mill, Ohio, 1929

In 1925, the world's first fully automatic elevator, Collective Control, was introduced. In 1931, the company installed the world's first double-deck elevator at 70 Pine Street in New York City.

In the early 1950s, the company introduced "Autotronic", an electromechanical computer system for running a bank of high speed elevator cars, which could predict the traffic flows within a building at specific times of the day and deploy the cars efficiently.

Otis opened a factory in Bloomington, Indiana, in 1965.

=== United Technologies ===
Otis was acquired by United Technologies in 1976 and became a wholly owned subsidiary. 1977 saw the introduction of "Elevonic" - the successor to Autotronic - which was the first solid state, digital microprocessor-based elevator control system.

==== 1980s ====
In 1981, the Yonkers factory closed, and was later purchased by Kawasaki for use as a rail car assembly plant. Also in 1981, Otis signed a business agreement with an elevator company in China.

During the 1980s, Otis developed the Remote Elevator Monitoring (REM) system that collected behavioral data from 300,000 elevators.

Otis has also dabbled in horizontal automated people-mover "shuttle" systems, such as the Otis Hovair. In 2020, Otis formed a joint venture called "Poma-Otis Transportation Systems" with the French company Pomagalski to promote these products. That partnership has since ended.

==== 1990s ====
Otis Elevator Company purchased Evans Lifts in the UK when Evans Lifts Ltd went bankrupt in 1997 during its merger with Express Lift Company with the name ExpressEvans. It was the oldest and largest manufacturer of lift equipment in the UK, and was based in Leicester, England. Otis's Customer Care Centre is still based in the old Evans Lifts building in Leicester. The building has since been extended by Otis. There are some installations of Evans Lifts in use today. Few lifts made by Otis are branded as Evans. Notably, an original Evans Lift is still in the Silver Arcade in Leicester. It formerly transported people to the upper floors.

In 1999, Otis acquired CemcoLift, Inc, located in Hatfield, Pennsylvania. The operation was later closed in October 2012, with the remaining business being sold to Minnesota Elevator Inc.

==== South Korea divisions ====
In 1910, Otis installed the first hydraulic elevator for transporting money at the Bank of Chosun, and installed the first elevator for passengers on the Korean Peninsula at a railway hotel. Since then, almost all elevators in the Korean Peninsula have been installed before the liberation, and even after liberation, they were the first to land in the Korean market, occupying about 80% of the elevators imported from Korea.

In 1982, it re-entered the Korean market through a technological alliance with Dongyang Elevator, and in 1991 took over the elevator manufacturer Korea Engineering and launched 'Korea OTIS Elevator'. The elevators supplied at this time were brought to Korea in the form of direct imports from overseas factories.

At the time, apart from OTIS Korea, the actual predecessor of Otis Elevator was LG Industrial Systems Elevator. In 1968, Youngjin Electric and Goldstar established elevator manufacturing plants in Juan, Incheon and Changwon, Gyeongsangnam-do, respectively. After forming an alliance, Hitachi Elevator entered the Korean market in 1979 through a joint venture with Goldstar. At that time, the Juan plant had the name 'Shin Yeong Electric' and the Changwon plant had the name 'Geumseong Sa', but in 1987, Geumseong Sa changed its name to 'Geumseong Sanjeon' and Shin Yeong Electric's changed its name to 'Geumseong Sanjeon', which combined the Geumseong Electrician and Geumseong Sanjeon. It was called 'Goldstar Elevator'. In February 1995, Goldstar Industrial Systems changed its name to 'LG Industrial Systems', and in September of the same year, LG Industrial Systems merged Goldstar Industrial Systems and Geumseong Industrial Systems(Korea). Afterwards, Otis established 'Otis Korea' in a joint venture with Dongyang Heavy Industries in February 1998.

Otis also took over the shares of LG Industrial Systems Elevator in December 1999 and changed the name of LG Industrial Systems Elevator to LG-OTIS. At the same time, the existing Korea OTIS was merged with it. In 2000, LG-OTIS founded Sigma Elevator and used Sigma brand to replace LG-OTIS, LG and Goldstar Brand at Overseas (International). The company name was also changed back to OTIS-LG. After the acquisition of shares was completed in 2005, LG Industrial Systems was separated into LS Industrial Systems and the 'LG' trade name was removed to become 'Otis Elevator Korea'.

==== 2000–2018 ====
In 2011, Otis acquired its competitor Marshall Elevator for an undisclosed amount. Beginning in 2011, Otis cut its manufacturing operations in Nogales, Mexico, and supply-chain operations in Tucson, as part of a consolidation of manufacturing operations in Florence, South Carolina, where Otis purchased a former Maytag facility on 92 acres. As part of the consolidation, Otis shut down its Bloomington facility in 2012.

In October 2013, Otis won its biggest ever contract to date, to supply 670 elevators and escalators to the Hyderabad Metro. Its second biggest contract had been in 2012, to supply 349 elevators for the Hangzhou metro. In 2015, Otis had to slow its expansion in Asia after orders in the region started to drop.

In January 2018, Otis Elevator Korea was recognized by Elevator World with its "New Construction Project of the Year" for the company's installation of the world's longest double-deck elevator (30 elevators) in the 555-meter Lotte World Tower in Seoul. The "sky shuttle" can take 54 passengers from the 2nd floor to the 121st floor in 1 minute.

=== Independent again ===
On November 26, 2018, United Technologies announced it would spin off Otis Elevator into an independent company. Its headquarters are to remain in Connecticut. In 2019, Otis geared up its artificial intelligence technology by capitalizing on predictive technologies.

In July 2022, Otis elevator company sold its business in Russia to S8 Capital holding. The holding received equipment, technologies and staff. In addition, the American side guaranteed uninterrupted supplies of the necessary spare parts. In early August, a new production line was launched. Since the end of January 2023, the company has been manufacturing products there under the Meteor Lift brand.

== Notable installations ==
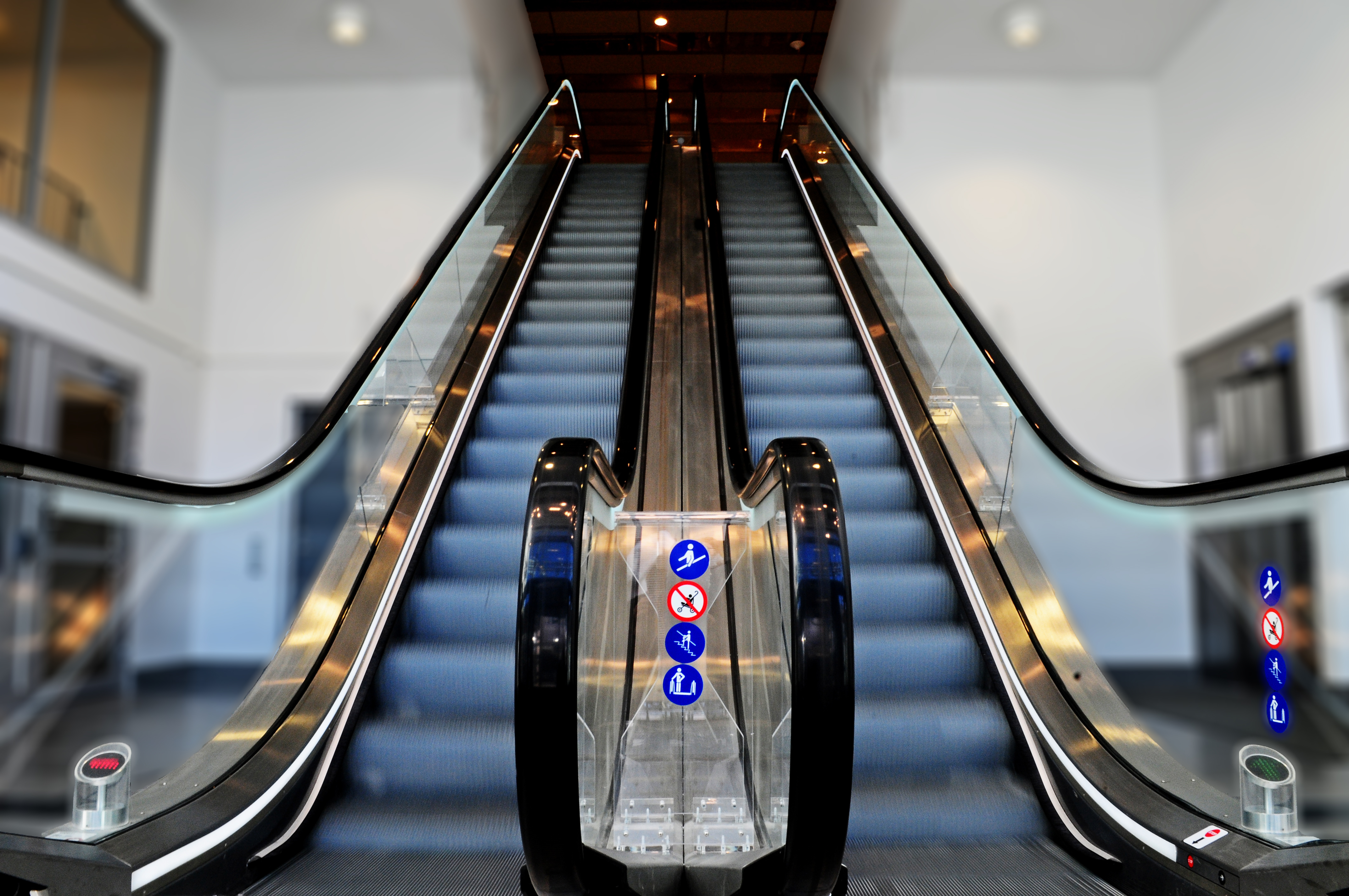
An Otis escalator

Otis has installed elevators in some of the world's most famous structures, including the world's tallest:

- Eiffel Tower
- Empire State Building (modernization partnership signed in 2011)
- The original World Trade Center
- The Twilight Zone Tower of Terror Attractions (including ride mechanisms)
- Petronas Twin Towers
- Burj Khalifa, the world's tallest structure
- CN Tower
- The Singing Tower at Bok Tower Gardens
- Skylon Tower
- 30 Hudson Yards
- Willis Tower (modernization)
- Raj Bhavan (India's first elevator)
- Atakule

== Incidents and controversies ==
In 1992, an Otis trainee died on the job due to orders to violate workplace safety protocols. OEEU organised protests in response, forcing the company to permanently take on 98 temporary workers and to stop their recruitment for permanent jobs. This had been a problem for several years at that point.

In 1998, two Otis workers died on the job in separate incidents in Mumbai, India. This led to a public discussion about the lack of safety training for contract workers at the company and an investigation by the Lokshahi Hakk Sanghatana Maharashtra, a democratic rights organization, which demanded that company management should be prosecuted for their negligence.

In 2001, due to a dated design flaw, 8-year-old Tucker Smith from Bel Air, Maryland was crushed to death by an Otis Elevator after becoming trapped in the gap between the outside door and the inside gate.

On August 14, 2002, Neil Raymond Ricco tripped while exiting an Otis Elevator while working at a Comerica Bank building in San Diego. He said it malfunctioned, causing the elevator to stop a foot below the floor level. Ricco was diagnosed with a concussion and a controversial investigation ensued.

In February 2007, European Union regulators fined Otis Elevator €225 million (US$295.8 million) for being part of a price-fixing cartel in the Belgian, Dutch, Luxembourg, and German markets. Competitors ThyssenKrupp, Schindler Group, KONE, and Mitsubishi Elevator Europe were also fined for participating in the same cartel.

On July 24, 2009, a group of eight people were trapped for eight hours in an Otis elevator in Toronto. A repair worker who tried to fix the elevator fell 10 floors to his death.

On December 14, 2010, an Otis escalator installed in the International Trade station of Shenzhen Metro Line 1 reversed direction without notice, triggering a stampede that injured 25 passengers.

On July 5, 2011, an Otis 513MPE escalator installed at Beijing Subway Line 4 Zoo Station changed direction without notice, causing 30 people to fall. One boy was killed and 27 people injured, prompting China to halt the use of the escalator model. A Beijing official said the 513MPE escalator had "defects in design, manufacturing and maintenance", and that Otis had "unavoidable responsibility for the accident". Shenzhen Metro authorities confirmed that the cause of the accident was also similar to the Shenzhen accident on December 14.

In March 2017, eighteen people suffered injuries at Hong Kong's Langham Place shopping mall when an escalator maintained by Otis reversed direction from up to down.

On July 9, 2018, a one-year-old Otis escalator at Stockholm City railway station changed direction from up to a rapid descent, in what local officials called a "free fall", causing minor injuries. Inspection of the gear boxes of several Otis escalators revealed unexpected rust and heavy wear. This led to the newly built train stations Stockholm City Station and Stockholm Odenplan being temporarily closed on July 13, 2018, for security reasons until the problems were understood and resolved.

== See also ==
- Otis Elevating Railway
- List of elevator manufacturers
