= Mud Lake =

Mud Lake may refer to several places:

== Cities, towns, townships ==
- Mud Lake, Idaho
- Mud Lake, Minnesota
- Mud Lake, Newfoundland and Labrador, Canada
- Mud Lake, Ontario, Canada

== Lakes ==
=== Canada ===
- Mud Lake (Alberta), several
- Mud Lake (British Columbia), several
- Mud Lake (Ontario), 74 different lakes
- Mud Lake (Saskatchewan), several

=== U.S. ===
- Mud Lake (Alabama)
- Mud Lake (Alaska), several
- Mud Lake (Arizona), several
- Mud Lake (Arkansas), over a dozen Mud Lakes in this state
- Mud Lake (California), over 30 Mud Lakes in this state
- Mud Lake (Colorado), several
- Mud Lake (Florida), over a dozen Mud Lakes in this state
- Mud Lake (Georgia), several
- Mud Lake (Idaho), several
- Mud Lake (Illinois), several
- Mud Lake (Indiana), over a dozen Mud Lakes in this state
- Mud Lake (Iowa), several
- Mud Lake (Kentucky), several
- Mud Lake (Louisiana), over a dozen Mud Lakes in this state
- Mud Lake (Maine), several
- Mud Lake (Michigan), over 150 Mud Lakes in this state
- Mud Lake (Minnesota), over 150 Mud Lakes in this state
- Mud Lake (Mississippi), several
- Mud Lake (Missouri), several
- Mud Lake (Montana), over a dozen Mud Lakes in this state
- Mud Lake (Nebraska), several
- Mud Lake (Nevada), several
- Mud Lake (New Mexico)
- Mud Lake (New York), over 30 Mud Lakes in this state
- Mud Lake (North Dakota), several
- Mud Lake (Ohio), several
- Mud Lake (Oregon), over a dozen Mud Lakes in this state
- Mud Lake (Pennsylvania), several
- Mud Lake (South Dakota), over a dozen Mud Lakes in this state
- Mud Lake (Tennessee)
- Mud Lake (Texas), over a dozen Mud Lakes in this state
- Mud Lake (Utah), several
- Mud Lake (Washington), over 30 Mud Lakes in this state
- Mud Lake (Wisconsin), over 150 Mud Lakes in this state
- Mud Lake (Wyoming), over a dozen Mud Lakes in this state

== See also ==
- Mud Creek (disambiguation)
- Mud Lake Canal, a prehistoric canal in the Everglades National Park
