= Muddy Creek =

Muddy Creek may refer to:

== Colorado ==
- Muddy Creek (Colorado), a tributary of the Colorado River

== Iowa ==
- Muddy Creek (Iowa River tributary), a stream

== Missouri ==
- Muddy Creek (Cass County, Missouri), a tributary of the Grand River
- Muddy Creek (Daviess County, Missouri), a tributary of the Grand River
- Muddy Creek (Grand River tributary Livingston County, Missouri), a tributary of the Grand River
- Muddy Creek (Lamine River tributary), a stream
- Muddy Creek (Nodaway River tributary), a stream

== Montana ==
- Muddy Creek A tributary stream of the Sun River
- Big Muddy Creek A stream in Meagher County Montana

== North Carolina ==
- Muddy Creek (Deep River tributary), a stream in Randolph and Guilford Counties

== Ohio ==
- Muddy Creek (Little Miami River tributary), a stream

== Oregon ==
- Muddy Creek (Oregon), several bodies of water, including:
  - Muddy Creek (Linn County, Oregon), a tributary of the Willamette River
  - Muddy Creek Reservoir or Junipers Reservoir, in Lake County

== Pennsylvania ==
- Muddy Creek (Conestoga River tributary), a stream
- Muddy Creek (French Creek tributary), a stream
- Muddy Creek (Slippery Rock Creek tributary), a stream
- Muddy Creek (Susquehanna River tributary), a stream

== Utah ==
- Muddy Creek (central Utah), a tributary of the Dirty Devil River

== Wyoming ==
- Muddy Creek, Wyoming, a tributary of the Little Snake River

== See also ==
- Mud Creek (disambiguation)
- Muddy (disambiguation)
- Muddy River (disambiguation)
- Muddy Run (disambiguation)
