= Coburg (disambiguation) =

Coburg is a town in Germany.

Coburg may also refer to:

== Places ==
=== Antarctica ===
- Coburg Peak, Graham Land

=== Australia ===
- Coburg, Victoria, a suburb of Melbourne
  - Coburg railway station
- City of Coburg, a former local government area
- Cobourg Peninsula, Northern Territory

=== Canada ===
- Cobourg, Ontario
- Coburg Island, Nunavut

=== Germany ===
- Free State of Coburg, which existed from 1918 to 1920
- Coburg (district), a district of Bavaria
- Coburg (electoral district), a parliamentary constituency of Bavaria

=== United States ===
- Coburg, Indiana, an unincorporated community
- Coburg, Iowa, a city
- Coburg, Kentucky, an unincorporated community
- Coburg, Oregon, a city
- Coburg Hills, a range of foothills of the Cascades, east of Coburg, Oregon

== Sports ==
- FC Coburg, a football club in Bavaria
- DVV Coburg, a former football club in Bavaria, predecessor of FC Coburg
- HSC 2000 Coburg, a handball team in Bavaria
- Coburg Football Club, Coburg, Australia

== Schools ==
- Coburg University of Applied Sciences, Coburg, Bavaria
- Coburg High School, Coburg, Australia

== Other uses ==
- Coburg Dock, Port of Liverpool, England
- German weather ship WBS 2 Coburg, a Kriegsmarine weather ship
- Operation Coburg, a 1968 Australian and New Zealand Vietnam War operation

== See also ==
- Cobourg, a town in Ontario, Canada
- Johann Anton Coberg (1650–1708), German composer
- Koberg, a municipality in Schleswig-Holstein, Germany
- Koberg (Taunus), a hill in Hesse, Germany
