= Mud Creek =

Mud Creek may refer to one of the following watercourses, all in the United States except where noted otherwise:

== Illinois ==
- Mud Creek (Henry County, Illinois), a rural creek that forms from a small canal
- Mud Creek, a prior name of Stillman Creek (Illinois) in Ogle County

== Georgia ==
- Mud Creek (Chattahoochee River tributary), a stream in Habersham and Hall counties
- Mud Creek (Clear Creek tributary), a stream
- Mud Creek (Noses Creek tributary), a stream

== Missouri ==
- Mud Creek (Gasconade River tributary), a stream in Gasconade and Osage counties
- Mud Creek (Logan Creek tributary), a stream in Callaway County
- Mud Creek (Middle Fork Salt River tributary), a stream in Randolph and Monroe counties
- Mud Creek (Ramsey Creek tributary), a stream in Pike County
- Mud Creek (St. Francois County, Missouri), a stream

== New York ==
- Mud Creek (Ganargua Creek), a creek in Wayne County
- Mud Creek (New York), a creek in Tompkins County

== Texas ==
- Mud Creek (Angelina River tributary), a stream
- Mud Creek (Kinney County, Texas), a stream originally known as Maverick Creek

== Other locations ==
Listed alphabetically by state or province

- Mud Creek (Toronto), a creek in the Canadian province of Ontario
- Mud Creek (Wallowa County, Oregon), a creek in Oregon
- Mud Creek (Chillisquaque Creek tributary), a stream in Columbia and Montour counties, Pennsylvania
- Mud Creek (Tennessee River tributary), a stream in Tennessee

== See also ==
- Mud Creek Falls, in Rabun County, Georgia
- Mud Creek Glacier, located on Mount Shasta in California
- Mud Lake (disambiguation)
- Mud River (disambiguation)
- Muddy Creek (disambiguation)
