= Muddy =

Muddy most commonly means covered in mud.

Muddy may also refer to:

== Places ==
=== Canada ===
- Muddy Bay, Newfoundland and Labrador
- Muddy Brook, Maberly, Newfoundland and Labrador

=== United States ===
- Muddy, Illinois, a village
- Muddy, Montana, a census-designated place
- Muddy Branch, Maryland, a tributary stream of the Potomac River
- Muddy Brook (disambiguation)
- Muddy Creek (disambiguation)
- Muddy Fork (Oregon), a tributary of the Sandy River
- Muddy Mountain, near Casper, Wyoming
- Muddy Mountains, Nevada
- Muddy Pass (disambiguation)
- Muddy River (disambiguation)
- Muddy Run (disambiguation)

== Nickname or stage name ==
- Muddy Manninen (born 1957), Finnish guitarist
- Muddy Ruel (1896–1963), American professional baseball player
- Muddy Waters (1915–1983), American singer
- Muddy Wilbury, (born 1950–2017) a stage name of Tom Petty while in the group the Traveling Wilburys

== Arts and entertainment ==
- Muddy (film), 2021 Malayalam-language film
- Muddy Mole, the main character of the video game Mole Mania
- Muddy Mudskipper, a character from The Ren and Stimpy Show

== See also ==
- Baseball rubbing mud
- Mud (disambiguation)
