= Muddy Run =

Muddy Run may refer to:

- Muddy Run (Christina River tributary), a stream in New Castle County, Delaware
- Muddy Run (Georges Creek tributary), a stream in Fayette County, Pennsylvania
- Muddy Run (Conodoguinet Creek tributary), in Franklin County, Pennsylvania
- Muddy Run (Maurice River), a tributary of the Maurice River in New Jersey
- Muddy Run (West Branch Susquehanna River), in Northumberland County, Pennsylvania
- Muddy Run Pumped Storage Facility, a hydroelectric generation facility on the Susquehanna River in Pennsylvania
- Muddy Run (Spruce Run), in Union County, Pennsylvania

== See also ==
- Muddy Creek (disambiguation)
- Muddy River (disambiguation)
- Muddy (disambiguation)
