= Johannes Wagner (politician) =

German politician

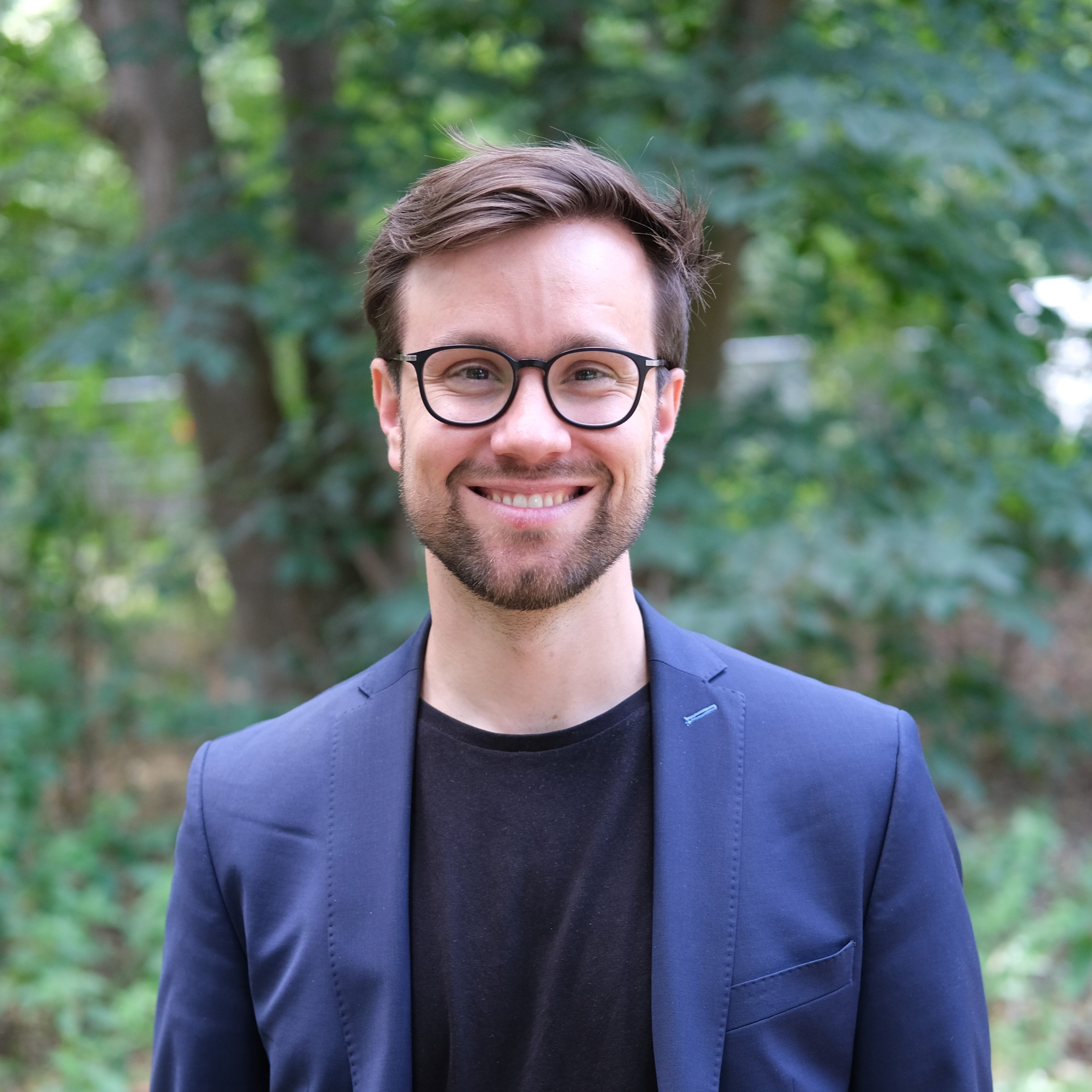
Johannes Wagner

Johannes Wagner (born 1 August 1991) is a German physician and politician of Alliance 90/The Greens who has been serving as a member of the Bundestag since 2021.

== Early life and education ==
Wagner was born 1991 in the German city of Nuremberg. He studied medicine at the University of Erlangen–Nuremberg as well as global health and tropical medicine at the University of Würzburg.

== Political career ==
Wagner became a member of the Bundestag in the 2021 elections, representing the Coburg district. In parliament, he has since been serving on the Health Committee, the Subcommittee on Global Health and the Parliamentary Advisory Board on Sustainable Development.

In addition to his committee assignments, Wagner chairs the German Parliamentary Friendship Group for Relations with the Andean States. Since 2022, he has been one of the founding members of a cross-party group promoting a One Health approach.

== Other activities ==
- Coburg University of Applied Sciences, Member of the Board of Trustees (since 2022)
- German Foundation for World Population (DSW), Member of the Parliamentary Advisory Board (since 2022)
- German Society for Tropical Medicine, Travel Medicine and Global Health (DTG), Member
- International Physicians for the Prevention of Nuclear War, Member
