= Mud River =

Mud River may refer to:

- Mud River (Georgia)
- Mud River (Kentucky)
- Mud River (Red Lake) in Minnesota
- Mud River (Thief River tributary) in Minnesota
- Mud River (West Virginia)

== See also ==
- Mud (disambiguation)
- Muddy River (disambiguation)
- Mud Creek (disambiguation)
