= Gallant Lake =

There are two lakes named Gallant Lake within the United States:

- Gallant Lake (Alabama), in Tuscaloosa County 33°13′37″N 87°10′38″W
- Gallant Lake, a reservoir in Bandera County, Texas 29°45′55″N 99°16′55″W
