= Federation II =

Low fantasy MUD

- Developers: Interactive Broadcasting, F2CE
- Publishers: Compunet, GEnie, AOL, independent
- Designer: Alan Lenton
- Platforms: Telnet, FedTerm, Platform independent
- Release: January 10, 1988
- Genre: Space Fantasy MUD

Federation II was a free-to-play online text-based game also known as Federation 2 or Fed2. It was designed by British programmer Alan Lenton and developed by IBGames. It centers on the intergalactic trade and economy in the distant future. It is coded in C++.

== History ==
=== Conception and launch (1986–1988) ===
Federation II was designed by British programmer Alan Lenton and developed by IBGames. Lenton originally conceived the title as a single-player bulletin board system (BBS) demo before expanding it into a multi-user environment. In June 1986, Computer and Video Games reported on the game's upcoming launch on the Compunet network, describing it as an expansion of concepts from the tabletop role-playing game Traveller featuring over 6,000 distinct virtual locations.

Following a public demonstration at the Adventure '87 convention, Federation II officially launched on January 10, 1988. At launch, it was recognized as one of the earliest commercial text-based MUDs to feature a science fiction and economic trading setting rather than traditional fantasy combat mechanics.

=== Commercial network expansions (1990–1997) ===
In 1990, the game migrated to the GEnie online service. The inclusion of "II" in the title led to widespread user assumption that the game was a sequel, despite no "Federation I" having existed. To reduce confusion, operators gradually dropped the roman numeral during this era, leading players to retrospectively refer to this period as "GEnie/Aries Fed". By 1992, access to the game on GEnie was billed at $6.00 per hour.

In May 1995, testing began for a portal on AOL, followed by an official open beta on June 21, 1995. The transition to AOL significantly increased the player base, particularly after AOL adopted flat-rate monthly pricing in early 1997. However, changing business strategies and AOL's desire to phase out legacy text-based infrastructure led to the termination of the partnership. Federation officially ceased operations on AOL in August 1997.

=== Web transition and reboot (1997–2018) ===
Following its removal from commercial proprietary networks, IBGames transitioned the title to a direct web-hosted architecture. Open beta testing for "Classic Fed on the Web" (or "Web Fed") began in October 1997 alongside the release of FedTerm, a dedicated graphical client software that introduced organized spatial layouts and mapping capabilities.

In late November 2003, a major hardware server failure rendered the original codebase unviable for long-term maintenance. In response, Lenton rebuilt the engine from the ground up, re-titling the updated game Federation 2 in homage to its original 1988 release. The updated version launched on December 25, 2003, transitioning to a freemium monetization system driven by an in-game microtransaction currency called "Slithies".

On September 2, 2018, IBGames announced that after 30 years of operation, official servers would permanently shut down on October 1, 2018.

=== Community Edition (2018–present) ===
Shortly after the official closure, a volunteer collective of long-time players acquired permission to preserve the codebase, founding Federation 2: Community Edition (F2CE). Operating as a non-profit project, F2CE modernizes the server infrastructure and client accessibility while retaining original economic mechanics. Under F2CE, the premium "Slithies" currency was converted into a free reward earned through daily logins and mission achievements.

== Gameplay ==
Federation II is a multiplayer text-based game set in a futuristic, sci-fi universe dominated by intergalactic commerce and politics. Unlike conventional MUDs of its era, which relied on combat and fantasy role-playing, Federation II operates primarily as an economic simulation focused on trade, resource management, and social standing.

=== Economy and trade ===
The core gameplay loop centers on buying commodities at low prices in one solar system and transporting them to other systems with high demand. Goods range from raw agricultural products to high-tech machinery. Players navigate using cardinal directions and spatial commands across star systems, docking at spaceports, planets, and navigating to planet commodity exchanges.

Economic mechanics are dynamic; market supply and demand fluctuate based on player trades, political events, and galactic inflation. As players accumulate wealth in galactic credits, they can upgrade from basic starter vessels to larger freighters equipped with expanded cargo holds, faster propulsion systems, and defensive shields.

=== Character ranks and progression ===
Player advancement in Federation II is defined by a structured hierarchy of social and political ranks rather than traditional character levels:

- Groundhog: The entry level in Fed is the Groundhog. At this rank, players are limited to ground movement on Earth. The “Newbod's Guide” and cues within the game instruct players on how to obtain a ship permit and purchase their first ship to reach promotion.
- Commander/Captain/Adventurer: Novice players earning initial capital through manual labor or low-margin local delivery jobs.
- Merchant & Trader: Mid-tier players managing personal starships, establish intersystem trade routes, and founding player-run businesses.
- Manufacturer: Advanced players who establish industrial factories, manage supply chains, and manufacture goods to control planetary supply monopolies.
- Planet Owner (Founder through Magnate): High-level players who acquire, build, and govern custom star systems. Planet owners set taxation rates, manage planetary infrastructures, and oversee orbital security.
- Plutocrat: The Plutocrat owns a cartel which is made up of their own system plus up to 14 additional player systems. Plutocrats may offer bonuses to recruit other planet owners to join the cartel. The Plutocrat continues to run a personal system of planets, and may continue to complete infrastructure builds on any one of those personally-owned planets.

=== Social interaction and virtual culture ===
Socialization plays a central role in Federation II, serving both as an informal trading market and a primary entertainment feature. The game features dedicated social hubs, most notably Chez Diesel—a popular virtual bar situated on Sol Prime where players gathered to converse, organize trading cartels, and engage in player-driven politics.

Communication relies on real-time chat channels, private messaging, and public bulletin boards. While player-versus-player combat exists in limited zones, non-violent political rivalries, economic blockades, and commercial competition form the primary modes of conflict between player factions.

=== Accessibility ===
F2CE is a completely text-based game and is compatible with screen reading software, making it accessible to visually impaired players. The game does not make use of auditory cues, so there is no disadvantage to players who may have hearing impairments. F2CE is compatible with MUD clients that make use of customisable user interfaces and can be used with assistive technologies, such as a footmouse.

In July 2026, standard client integration was further expanded when community-developed scripts ("Fed 2 Tools") were added to the official Mudlet package repository.

== Reception ==
Computer Gaming World in 1992 praised the social aspects of Federation II, stating that "the real center of the Federation universe is ... Chez Diesel". The magazine concluded that the game was "a marvelous social environment that uses simple, text-based game mechanics as an excuse to have an on-line party ... it's a cyburb where I wouldn't mind living".

In a survey later that year of science fiction games the magazine gave the game three-plus stars of five, and a 1994 survey of strategic space games set in the year 2000 and later gave the game three stars out of five.

In a September 1995 article in Computer Gaming World, during the beta test phase of AOL Fed, Wyatt Lee referred to Federation as “one of the wildest cyburbs in the telegaming universe”, calling it “one of the most 'real' imaginary universes you can visit”. In December of the same year, Electronic Entertainment published a review, calling Federation “The mother of multiplayer titles” with “Just about everything the power hungry could want”.

== Sources ==
- "Fed's First Years"
- "Fed Archives"
- "Alan Lenton's Web Site"
