= Jonas Geissler =

German politician (born 1984)

Jonas Geissler MdB

Member of the Bundestag; for Coburg
- Incumbent
- Assumed office 26 October 2021
- Preceded by: Hans Michelbach

Personal details
- Born: 5 June 1984 (age 42) Isny im Allgäu, West Germany
- Party: Christian Social Union
- Education: University of Erlangen–Nuremberg

Jonas Alexander Tecumseh Geissler (born 5 June 1984) is a German politician of the Christian Social Union (CSU) who has been serving as a member of the Bundestag since 2021. He has been representing the constituency of Coburg as a directly elected member of parliament.

== Early life and education ==
Geissler was born 1984 in the West German town of Isny and grew up in Kronach, where he still lives today. In 2003, he passed his A levels at the Kaspar-Zeuß-Gymnasium there. From 2003 to 2009, he studied political science, history and international relations in Erlangen and Budapest.

At the same time, from 2004 to 2007, he worked as a constituency assistant to Werner Schnappauf, a member of the Bavarian Landtag and Minister of the Environment. He received a PhD from the University of Erlangen–Nuremberg.

During his studies, he received a scholarship from the Hanns Seidel Foundation. From 2014, he worked as the office manager for Hans Reichhart in the Bavarian parliament before becoming a government councillor at the Bavarian State Ministry of Housing, Construction and Transport in 2018.

== Political career ==
=== Early beginnings ===
Geissler has been politically active in the CSU, Young Union and Students' Union since he was sixteen. Among other things, he was district chairman of the Schülerunion from 2003 to 2004, district chairman from 2006 to 2011 and district chairman of the Junge Union from 2010 to mid-2021. He has been a CSU district executive committee member since 2009 and deputy CSU district chairman since 2019. He has also led of the CSU city council faction in Kronach since 2014.

In 2008, Geissler was first elected to the city council of Kronach, and was re-elected in 2014 and 2020. He was also a member of the district council of the district of Kronach from 2008 to 2014 and has been again since 2017.

=== Member of the Bundestag (2021–present) ===
Geissler was elected directly to the Bundestag in 2021, representing the Coburg district. He has since been serving on the Committee on Transport and the Committee on Human Rights and Humanitarian Aid. In the Bundestag election, he received 36.2 per cent of the first votes and was thus elected to the German Bundestag. He succeeded Hans Michelbach, who did not stand for re-election.

In the negotiations to form a Grand Coalition under the leadership of Friedrich Merz's Christian Democrats (CDU together with the Bavarian CSU) and the Social Democratic Party (SPD) following the 2025 German elections, Geissler was part of the CDU/CSU delegation in the working group on digital policy, led by Manuel Hagel, Reinhard Brandt and Armand Zorn.

== Other activities ==
=== Government agencies ===
- Federal Network Agency for Electricity, Gas, Telecommunications, Posts and Railway (BNetzA), Alternate Member of the Rail Infrastructure Advisory Council (since 2022)
- German Institute for Human Rights (DIMR), Member of the Board of Trustees (since 2022)

=== Non-profit organizations ===
- Coburg University of Applied Sciences, Member of the Board of Trustees (since 2022)
- Haus der Geschichte, Member of the Board of Trustees

== Personal life ==
Geissler is a Protestant and single.
