= Jacob C. Spores House =

- Formerly listed on the U.S. National Register of Historic Places
- Location: 90311 Coburg Rd, Eugene, Oregon
- Nearest city: Coburg, Oregon
- Area: 5 acres (2.0 ha)
- Built: 1854
- Architectural style: Greek Revival
- NRHP reference No.: 77001107

Significant dates
- Added to NRHP: November 2, 1977
- Removed from NRHP: August 1, 2001

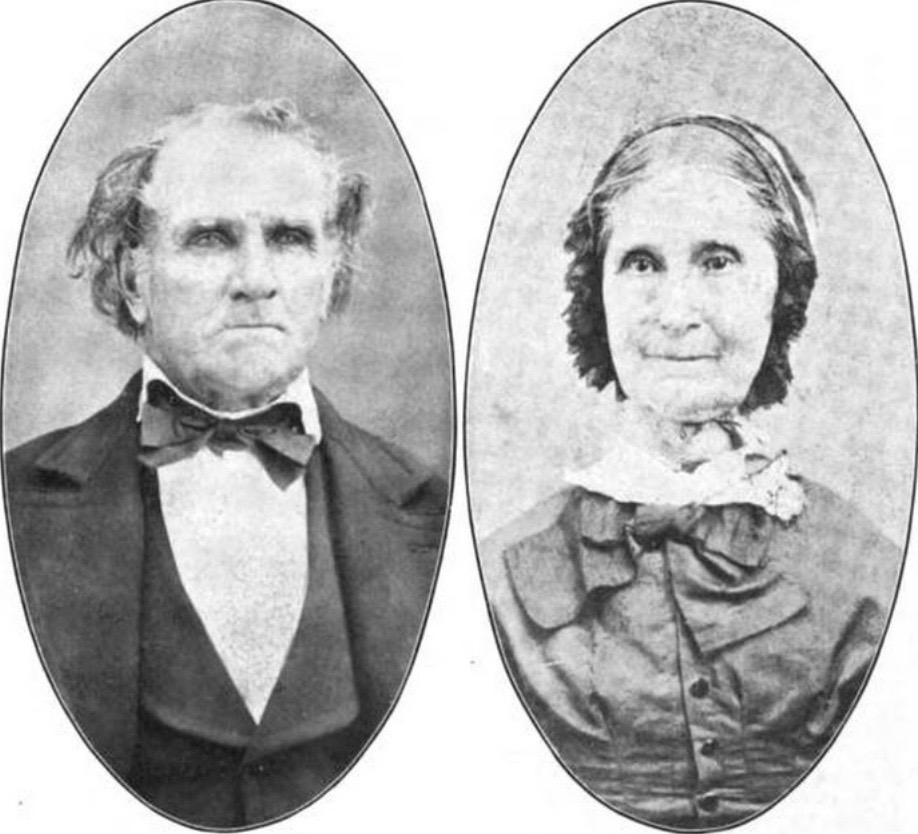
Jacob and Nancy Spores

The Jacob C. Spores House was a house located between south of Coburg and north of Eugene, Oregon, which was formerly listed on the National Register of Historic Places. It was removed from the register on August 1, 2001. The classical revival house underwent an "exceptional" restoration in 1975, but a September 1996 fire "destroyed most, if not all, of the historical value of the house". By 1998, the owners were again restoring the house, but according to the Oregon State Historic Preservation office, as of 2013, the house has been demolished.

Jacob Spores was an early settler of the Coburg area, who started the first ferry across the McKenzie River at the site. The house was thought to be the oldest in Lane County.

== See also ==
- Historic ferries in Oregon
- National Register of Historic Places listings in Lane County, Oregon
