= Muddy Creek (Oregon) =

There are at least 10 bodies of water in the U.S. state of Oregon named Muddy Creek and many more derivations of it:

Name	Type	Elevation	Coordinates	USGS map	GNIS ID
Big Muddy Creek (Baker County, Oregon)	Stream	3,307 ft (1,008 m)	44°56′24″N 117°56′49″W	Haines	1116734
Little Muddy Creek (Baker County, Oregon)	Stream	3,314 ft (1,010 m)	44°56′36″N 117°57′16″W	Haines	1123239
Muddy Creek (Marys River)	Stream	230 ft (70 m)	44°31′14″N 123°18′08″W	Corvallis	1146614
Muddy Creek (Clackamas County, Oregon)	Stream	141 ft (43 m)	45°07′35″N 122°41′44″W	Yoder	1132739
Little Muddy Creek (Clatsop County, Oregon)	Stream	13 ft (4.0 m)	45°58′29″N 123°56′09″W	Tillamook Head	1132357
Little Muddy Creek (Harney County, Oregon)	Stream	3,707 ft (1,130 m)	43°51′25″N 118°34′01″W	House Butte	1145215
Muddy Creek (Harney County, Oregon)	Stream	3,730 ft (1,140 m)	43°51′59″N 118°34′56″W	House Butte	1146613
Little Muddy Creek (Jefferson County, Oregon)	Stream	2,234 ft (681 m)	44°45′11″N 120°30′22″W	Arrastra Butte	1123238
Little Muddy Creek (Lake County, Oregon)	Stream	4,879 ft (1,487 m)	42°11′38″N 120°31′50″W	Drews Gap	1145214
Muddy Creek (Lake County, Oregon)	Stream	4,774 ft (1,455 m)	42°08′49″N 120°28′51″W	Lakeview Airport	1146612
Muddy Creek Dam (Lake County, Oregon)	Dam	4,862 ft (1,482 m)	42°11′41″N 120°31′18″W	Drews Gap	1155623
Junipers Reservoir (Muddy Creek Reservoir)	Lake	4,872 ft (1,485 m)	42°11′57″N 120°31′29″W	Drews Gap	1637878
Dry Muddy Creek (Linn County, Oregon)	Stream	322 ft (98 m)	44°14′59″N 123°06′48″W	Coburg	1120180
Little Muddy Creek (Linn County, Oregon)	Stream	282 ft (86 m)	44°21′09″N 123°08′28″W	Harrisburg	1123237
Muddy Creek (Linn County, Oregon)	Stream	210 ft (64 m)	44°32′14″N 123°13′19″W	Riverside	1124505
Muddy Creek (Wasco County, Oregon)	Stream	1,322 ft (403 m)	44°51′47″N 120°26′27″W	Muddy Ranch	1124506
Muddy Creek (Wheeler County, Oregon)	Stream	2,972 ft (906 m)	44°52′59″N 120°02′11″W	Kinzua	1124503
Muddy Creek (Yamhill County, Oregon)	Stream	144 ft (44 m)	45°07′33″N 123°17′20″W	Muddy Valley	1124504
Middle Fork Muddy Creek (Yamhill County, Oregon)	Stream	253 ft (77 m)	45°09′29″N 123°19′04″W	Muddy Valley	1130168
East Fork Muddy Creek (Yamhill County, Oregon)	Stream	210 ft (64 m)	45°09′39″N 123°19′04″W	Muddy Valley	1130169

== See also ==
- List of rivers of Oregon
- List of lakes in Oregon
