= Wolfgang Stammberger =

German jurist and politician

Minister of Justice
- In office 14 November 1961 – 19 November 1962
- Chancellor: Konrad Adenauer
- Preceded by: Fritz Schäffer
- Succeeded by: Ewald Bucher

Member of the Bundestag; from Bavaria
- In office 6 October 1953 – 20 October 1969
- Preceded by: Ernst Zühlke
- Succeeded by: Multi-member district
- Constituency: Coburg (1953–1957); State list (1957–1969)

Personal details
- Born: 14 July 1920 Coburg, Germany
- Died: 1 May 1982 (aged 61) Coburg, West Germany
- Party: Social Democratic (1964–1978)
- Other political affiliations: FDP (1946–1964)
- Children: 3
- Relatives: Sabine Leutheusser-Schnarrenberger (niece)
- Education: University of Erlangen
- Profession: Lawyer

Wolfgang Stammberger (14 July 1920 – 1 May 1982) was a German jurist and politician. He served as German Minister of Justice from 1961 to 1962. He resigned because of the Spiegel affair, as he had not known the plan to arrest Rudolf Augstein and the others.

Born in Coburg, Bavaria, Stammberger saw his studies interrupted by World War II, but eventually earned his doctorate from the University of Erlangen. He became a member of the German Bundestag in 1953, and retained his seat until 1969. In 1964, he switched from the Free Democratic Party to the Social Democratic Party. Between 1970 and 1978, he served as mayor of Coburg.

He was active in two Freemasonry lodges.

His niece, Sabine Leutheusser-Schnarrenberger, later also served as Minister of Justice.
