= Hans Michelbach =

German politician (born 1949)

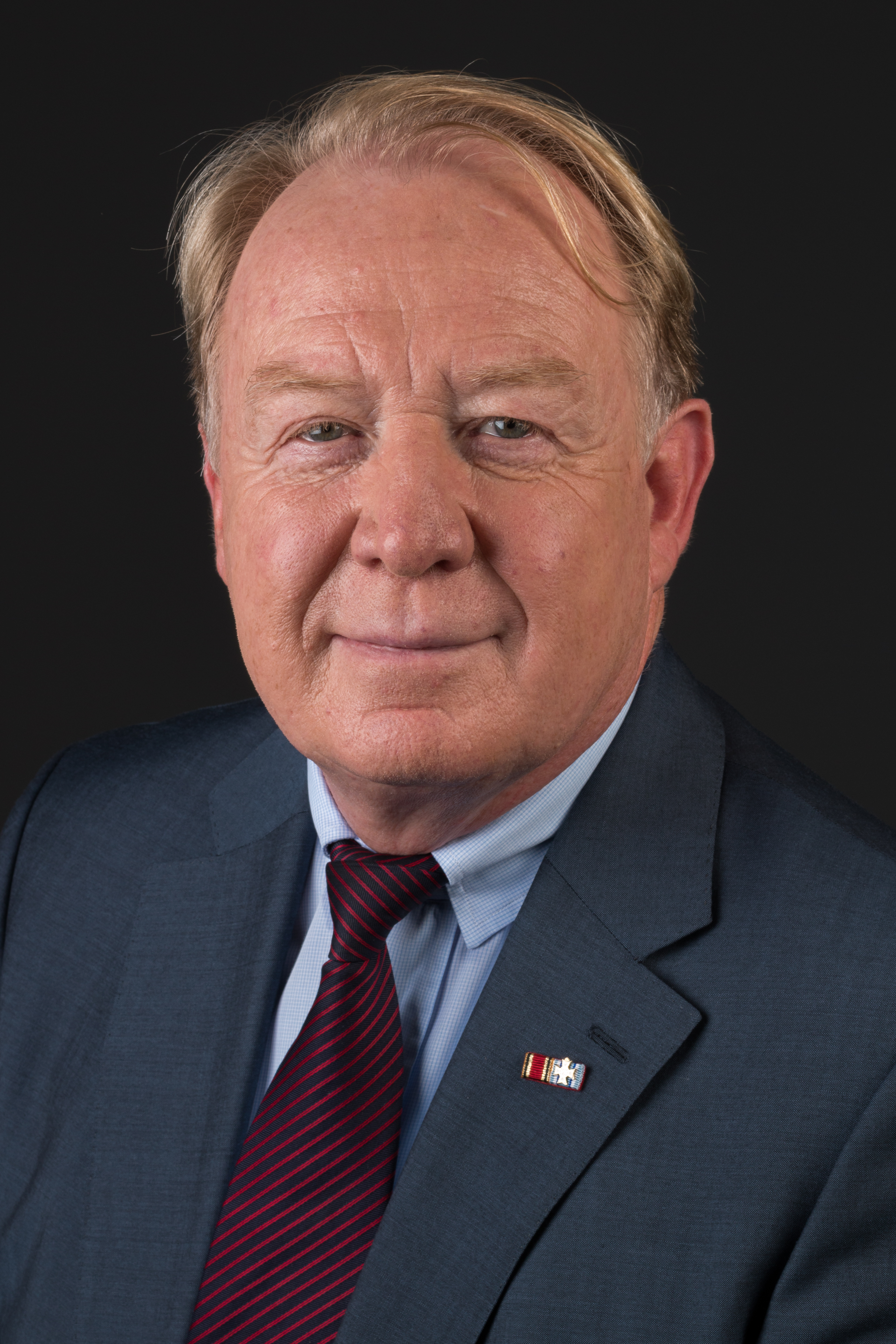
- Michelbach in 2014

Member of the Bundestag; from Bavaria
- In office 10 November 1994 – 26 October 2021
- Preceded by: Multi-member district
- Succeeded by: Jonas Geissler
- Constituency: State list (1994–2002); Coburg (2002–2021)

Personal details
- Born: 3 May 1949 (age 77) Gemünden am Main, West Germany
- Party: Christian Social Union
- Children: 3

Hans Michelbach (born 3 May 1949) is a German politician of the Christian Social Union (CSU) who has been serving as a member of the Bundestag from the state of Bavaria from 1994 until 2021.

He represented Coburg from 2002 to 2021.

== Political career ==
Michelbach became a member of the Bundestag in the 1994 German federal election, representing Coburg. Throughout his time in parliament, he was a member of the Finance Committee. From 1994 until 1998, he also served on the Budget Committee. In this capacity, he was also the party's main spokesman on budgetary matters.

In the negotiations to form a Grand Coalition of the Chancellor Angela Merkel's Christian Democrats (CDU together with the Bavarian CSU) and the Social Democratic Party (SPD) following the 2013 federal elections, Michelbach was part of the CDU/CSU delegation in the working group on economic policy, led by Ilse Aigner and Hubertus Heil. In the negotiations to form Merkel’s fourth coalition government following the 2017 federal elections, he was part of the working group on financial policies and taxes, led by Peter Altmaier, Andreas Scheuer and Olaf Scholz.

During his term in office, CSU politician Hans Michelbach received money as a partner in MIBEG Investment International, a project developer in the real estate industry.

In October 2020, Michelbach announced that he would not stand in the 2021 federal elections but instead resign from active politics by the end of the parliamentary term.

== Political positions ==
In June 2017, Michelbach was one of only seven CSU members who voted in favor of Germany’s introduction of same-sex marriage.

Within the German Parliament, Michelbach was a high-profile critic of Mario Draghi’s term as president of the European Central Bank.

When European Commissioner for Economy Paolo Gentiloni announced plans to re-examine the European Union’s Stability and Growth Pact as part of a European Green Deal in late 2019, Michelbach warned the Commission against any attempt to loosen the EU’s budget rules: “Gentiloni’s plans are an attack on the stabilisation goals under the pretext of protecting the climate.”
