= Compunet =

UK-based interactive service provider

Login page

Compunet was a United Kingdom-based interactive service provider, catering primarily for the Commodore 64 but later for the Amiga and Atari ST. It was also known by its users as CNet. It ran from 1984 to May 1993.

== Overview ==
Compunet hosted a wide range of content, and users were permitted to create their own sections within which they could upload their own graphics, articles and software. A custom editor existed in which the "frames" that made up the pages could be created either offline or when connected to the service. The editor's cache allowed users to quickly download a set of pages, then disconnect from the service in order to read them, thus saving on telephone costs.

The user interface used a horizontally scrolling menu system, known as the "duck shoot", and navigation was essentially "select and click" with the ability to jump directly to pages with the use of keywords. Content could be voted upon by the users.

The service had many features which were considerably ahead of its time, especially when compared to the Internet of today:

- Pricing of content (Optional. Users could price their own content).
- Voting on content quality.
- "Upload anywhere" of content: programs, graphics and text (Unless a section was protected).
- Software could be dongle protected (the custom modem doubled as the dongle in this instance).
- WYSIWYG editing of content.
- Chat room (known as Partyline), which allowed users to create their own rooms (similar principles have been shown in IRC).

The server hosted Multi-User Dungeon (MUD) (by Richard Bartle), Federation II, and Realm. The first two of these games continue to run on the Internet today.

Games creator Jeff Minter and musician Rob Hubbard, along with various members of the demo scene, had a presence on the network.

== History ==
In 1982, Commodore UK decided to construct a nationwide computer network for the use of teachers. The Commodore PET computer had been very successful. Nick Green developed the specification of what became PETNET with David Parkinson and Mike Bolley of Ariadne Software in The Albany pub (see "PETNET - data transmission system" in "Microcomputers in education" ed Dr I.C.H. Smith 1982 John Wiley ISBN 0-85312-424-8).

In the Summer of 1982 Keith Hall of Commodore secured the money to commission the prototype which was run on an ADP DEC-10 machine. Ariadne Software wrote the software in 6502 assembly language for the client and FORTRAN for the host. The X.25 packet protocol was modified to provide error correction for all file transfers. At ADP's suggestion reliable uploading was achieved by using temporary file names which were changed to user file names when the last byte had been correctly received by the host. Nick Green sought partners who could provide local call access and Host facilities. Alan Carmichael, Graham Craigie and Robert Foot of ADP joined the project.

Around this time the BBC Micro was released and gained enormous popularity within the UK education system. PETNET became Compunet which was aimed to support consumer and educational users.

Nick Green specified a secure modem based on the Viewdata chip set and the assembly language client software was ported into the modem and bundled with the Commodore 1541 disk drive. After the first year Commodore was bought out and Compunet Teleservices Ltd became an independent company. Compunet culture was covered in the first issue of Commodore Disk User, which shipped software on its cover disk.

ADP provided the initial DEC-10 mainframe, as well as the local-access dial-up points. But this was very expensive and a scheduled migration to a VME bus based multi-micro machine was successfully undertaken. New local dial-up points were provided by ISTEL (on their Fastrak network). After a management buy out ISTEL was sold to AT&T. This led to the failure of ISTEL technical support and an upgrade of local access to 2400/2400 baud. The best efforts of Ariadne and Compunet staffers Jason Gold and Mark Clarke came to nothing as the English legal system failed to protect Compunet's contracts. This meant a higher cost nationwide rate call for most users. A third move of the Compunet Host to Camden in North London was undertaken with Nick Green now board chair and MD.

By this time client software was ported to the Amiga and Atari ST and a teletype-compatible version of the service using BBS scrolling text was introduced aimed at integration with the Internet and PCs.

Compunet ceased trading in May 1993, when the company went into receivership for non-payment of VAT after the sudden short illness and death of Jim Chalmers, their sole practitioner accountant. He was negotiating a VAT refund at the time. Immediate barrister intervention failed despite £250,000 of debt asset.

== Subscription model ==
Compunet charged a quarterly subscription, and telephone call costs were in addition to this. Typical off-peak charges would be £0.80UKP per hour.

Premium services incurred additional charges, which required the user to first place money in their account. These services included:

- Private e-mail (some free quota was provided).
- Uploading content.
- Custom banners.
- Customised user name (instead of, for example, 'abc3').
- Access to chat and gaming services.

== Technology ==
=== Client ===
For the Commodore 64, Compunet provided a custom 1200/75 bit/s modem (affectionately known as the "brick") which utilised the machine's cartridge port. As well as the usual modem features, the device had a custom ROM which contained the rudiments of the software required to access the service. This software could be updated automatically upon connection to the service.

Out of the box, the modem was unable to connect to standard Bulletin board systems unless an optional software package was purchased.

The modem was programmed with a unique ID. This allowed it to work as a dongle to help prevent copyright infringement of protected software.

The custom nature of the technology hindered Compunet to a degree. The graphical design was very much keyed into the Commodore 64's graphical capabilities. Although this was more powerful than the Viewdata systems such as Prestel, it meant porting was difficult. However, software was later made available for the Amiga (1987) and Atari ST (1988). A PC version was developed in-house but never made publicly available.

The Amiga and Atari ST versions both emulated the graphics and interface of the original Commodore 64. However, the PC version was teletype in nature, utilising Kermit for file transfers.

=== Server ===
The host server was a DEC-10 at launch, which ran Compunet as a time-slice. ADP provided the mainframe, as well as the local dial-up points, which allowed users all over the country access for the cost of a local telephone call.

Specification:

- 1 megaword 36 bit RAM (upgraded for Compunet).
- £50,000 per month running costs (including the local-rate telephone call facilities).
- Compunet host software written in Fortran, by Ariadne Software and further developed by Robert Foot with chat and real-time user and management accounting.

When ADP announced it was to shut down its DEC-10 network in Great Portland Street, Central London, Nick Green then consultant to Compunet and Mark Clarke (ex Commodore guru) researched closely coupled multi-micro architectures. Compunet was rewritten in C and migrated to a VME rack configured by Cambridge Micro Computers in the Park Royal Industrial Estate. It ran under OS-9 with a single 25 MHz master board.

Specification:

- VME bus.
- 1 × 6820 for disk access.
- 10 megabytes RAM.
- 4 × 200 megabyte hard disks for storage.
- 3 × 6810s (5 megabytes RAM each) for communications.
- 52 simultaneous connections.

== See also ==
- Micronet 800

== Sources ==
- Article: "CNET - Moving with the times"
- Direct discussion with Nick Green (ex-chairman of Compunet).
