= Mud Lake (Mississippi) =

There are several lakes named Mud Lake within the U.S. state of Mississippi.

- Mud Lake, DeSoto County, Mississippi and Shelby County, Tennessee. 34°59′36″N 90°12′22″W
- Mud Lake, Holmes County, Mississippi. 33°16′08″N 90°12′45″W
- Mud Lake, Neshoba County, Mississippi. 32°50′10″N 89°12′45″W
- Mud Lake, Tate County, Mississippi. 34°40′56″N 90°12′43″W
- Mud Lake, Tunica County, Mississippi. 34°36′11″N 90°32′11″W
- Mud Lake, Tunica County, Mississippi. 34°37′05″N 90°34′18″W
- Mud Lake, Tunica County, Mississippi. 34°42′16″N 90°20′32″W
- Mud Lake, Yazoo County, Mississippi. 32°40′27″N 90°11′40″W
