= Muddy Pass =

Muddy Pass may refer to:

- Muddy Pass (Continental Divide), a mountain pass on the Continental Divide of the Americas in the Park Range of Colorado
- Powder River Pass, sometimes known as Muddy Pass, in the Bighorn Mountains, Wyoming, United States

== See also ==
- Muddy (disambiguation)
- List of mountain passes
