= Mud Lake (Florida) =

Lake in the state of Florida, United States

There are many lakes named Mud Lake within the U.S. state of Florida.

- Mud Lake, Collier County, Florida. 26°03′32″N 81°07′27″W
- Mud Lake, Flagler County, Florida. 29°24′39″N 81°24′37″W
- Mud Lake, Hardee County, Florida. 27°27′56″N 81°51′22″W
- Mud Lake, Highlands County, Florida. 27°33′47″N 81°25′44″W (See Mud Lake (Highlands County, Florida)
- Mud Lake, Hillsborough County, Florida. 27°59′25″N 82°08′56″W
- Mud Lake, Lake County, Florida. 28°59′27″N 81°22′23″W
- Mud Lake, Manatee County, Florida. 27°24′31″N 82°08′37″W
- Mud Lake, Marion County, Florida. 29°18′02″N 81°51′56″W
- Mud Lake, Monroe County, Florida. 25°10′54″N 80°56′15″W
- Mud Lake, Orange County, Florida. 28°23′24″N 81°17′30″W
- Mud Lake, Orange County, Florida. 28°37′28″N 81°21′34″W
- Mud Lake, Orange County, Florida. 28°40′41″N 81°32′45″W
- Mud Lake, Orange County, Florida. 28°42′26″N 81°35′48″W
- Lake Geneva, also known as Mud Lake, Pasco County, Florida. 28°11′16″N 82°34′20″W
- Mud Lake, Pasco County, Florida. 28°17′48″N 82°06′10″W
- Mud Lake, Pasco County, Florida. 28°25′53″N 82°17′15″W
- Mud Lake, Polk County, Florida. 27°50′54″N 81°46′29″W
- Mud Lake, Polk County, Florida. 28°10′10″N 81°50′37″W
- Mud Lake, Putnam County, Florida. 29°36′55″N 81°42′19″W
- Mud Lake, Sumter County, Florida. 28°38′07″N 82°08′02″W
- Mud Lake, Sumter County, Florida. 28°38′08″N 82°06′29″W
- Mud Lake, Taylor County, Florida. 30°16′05″N 83°38′12″W
- Mud Lake, Volusia County, Florida. 28°48′22″N 81°08′32″W
- Tick Island Mud Lake, also known as Mud Lake, Volusia County, Florida. 29°05′15″N 81°26′24″W
