= Coburg (electoral district) =

Federal electoral district of Germany

237 Coburg
- Electoral district for the Bundestag
- Coburg in 2025
- State: Bavaria
- Population: 197,300 (2019)
- Electorate: 153,392 (2025)
- Major settlements: Coburg; Kronach; Neustadt bei Coburg
- Area: 1,305.8 km^{2}

Current electoral district
- Created: 1949
- Party: CSU
- Member: Jonas Geissler
- Elected: 2021, 2025

Coburg is an electoral constituency (German: Wahlkreis) represented in the Bundestag. It elects one member via first-past-the-post voting. Under the current constituency numbering system, it is designated as constituency 237. It is located in northern Bavaria, comprising the city of Coburg and the districts of Landkreis Coburg and Kronach.

Coburg was created for the inaugural 1949 federal election. Since 2021, it has been represented by Jonas Geissler of the Christian Social Union (CSU).

== Geography ==
Coburg is located in northern Bavaria. As of the 2021 federal election, it comprises the independent city of Coburg, the districts of Landkreis Coburg and Kronach, and the municipality of Geroldsgrün from the Hof district.

== History ==
Coburg was created in 1949. In the 1949 election, it was Bavaria constituency 26 in the numbering system. In the 1953 through 1961 elections, it was number 221. In the 1965 through 1998 elections, it was number 224. In the 2002 and 2005 elections, it was number 239. In the 2009 through 2021 elections, it was number 238. From the 2025 election, it has been number 237.

Originally, the constituency comprised the independent cities of Coburg and Neustadt bei Coburg and the districts of Landkreis Coburg and Kronach. In the 1976 through 2013 elections, it comprised the city of Coburg and the districts of Landkreis Coburg and Kronach. In the 2017 election, it acquired the municipality of Geroldsgrün from the Hof district.

Election	No.	Name	Borders
1949	26	Coburg	Coburg city; Neustadt bei Coburg city; Landkreis Coburg district; Kronach district
1953	221	Coburg	Coburg city; Neustadt bei Coburg city; Landkreis Coburg district; Kronach district
1957	221	Coburg	Coburg city; Neustadt bei Coburg city; Landkreis Coburg district; Kronach district
1961	221	Coburg	Coburg city; Neustadt bei Coburg city; Landkreis Coburg district; Kronach district
1965	224	Coburg	Coburg city; Neustadt bei Coburg city; Landkreis Coburg district; Kronach district
1969	224	Coburg	Coburg city; Neustadt bei Coburg city; Landkreis Coburg district; Kronach district
1972	224	Coburg	Coburg city; Neustadt bei Coburg city; Landkreis Coburg district; Kronach district
1976	224	Coburg	Coburg city; Landkreis Coburg district; Kronach district
1980	224	Coburg	Coburg city; Landkreis Coburg district; Kronach district
1983	224	Coburg	Coburg city; Landkreis Coburg district; Kronach district
1987	224	Coburg	Coburg city; Landkreis Coburg district; Kronach district
1990	224	Coburg	Coburg city; Landkreis Coburg district; Kronach district
1994	224	Coburg	Coburg city; Landkreis Coburg district; Kronach district
1998	224	Coburg	Coburg city; Landkreis Coburg district; Kronach district
2002	239	Coburg	Coburg city; Landkreis Coburg district; Kronach district
2005	239	Coburg	Coburg city; Landkreis Coburg district; Kronach district
2009	238	Coburg	Coburg city; Landkreis Coburg district; Kronach district
2013	238	Coburg	Coburg city; Landkreis Coburg district; Kronach district
2017	238	Coburg	Coburg city; Landkreis Coburg district; Kronach district; Hof district (only Geroldsgrün municipality)
2021	238	Coburg	Coburg city; Landkreis Coburg district; Kronach district; Hof district (only Geroldsgrün municipality)
2025	237	Coburg	Coburg city; Landkreis Coburg district; Kronach district; Hof district (only Geroldsgrün municipality)

== Members ==
The constituency was first represented by Ernst Zühlke of the Social Democratic Party (SPD) from 1949 to 1953. Wolfgang Stammberger won it in 1953; he was elected for the Free Democratic Party (FDP) with the endorsement of the Christian Social Union (CSU). Friedrich Knorr of the CSU was elected in 1957 and served until 1965. Karl Hofmann of the SPD won the constituency in 1965 and served three terms, leaving office in 1976. Otto Regenspurger of the CSU then served until 1998, when Uwe Hiksch was elected representative for a single term. Hiksch was elected for the SPD, but defected to the Party of Democratic Socialism (PDS) in October 1999. Hans Michelbach of the CSU was elected in 2002 and served until 2021. He was succeeded by Jonas Geissler in 2021, who was re-elected in 2025.

Election	Member	Party	%
1949	Ernst Zühlke	SPD	35.7
1953	Wolfgang Stammberger	FDP	52.8
1957	Friedrich Knorr	CSU	45.5
1961	Friedrich Knorr	CSU	41.4
1965	Karl Hofmann	SPD	46.4
1969	Karl Hofmann	SPD	49.0
1972	Karl Hofmann	SPD	53.3
1976	Otto Regenspurger	CSU	49.0
1980	Otto Regenspurger	CSU	49.1
1983	Otto Regenspurger	CSU	55.9
1987	Otto Regenspurger	CSU	47.2
1990	Otto Regenspurger	CSU	54.3
1994	Otto Regenspurger	CSU	49.4
1998	Uwe Hiksch (Note: Hiksch was elected for the SPD, but joined the PDS in October 1999.)	SPD	47.8
1998	Uwe Hiksch	PDS	47.8
2002	Hans Michelbach	CSU	48.2
2005	Hans Michelbach	CSU	52.0
2009	Hans Michelbach	CSU	48.4
2013	Hans Michelbach	CSU	50.1
2017	Hans Michelbach	CSU	45.3
2021	Jonas Geissler	CSU	36.5
2005	Jonas Geissler	CSU	52.0

== Election results ==
=== 2025 election ===
Federal election (2025): Coburg
Notes:	Blue background denotes the winner of the electorate vote. Pink background denotes a candidate elected from their party list. Yellow background denotes an electorate win by a list member, or other incumbent. A ✓ or ✗ denotes status of any incumbent, win or lose respectively.						
Party	Candidate	Votes	%	±%	Party votes	%	±%
CSU	✓ Jonas Geissler						
AfD	Michael Theodor Gebhardt	26,821	20.9	▲11.3	28,512	22.2	▲11.8
SPD	Jonas Bastian Eckstein	18,425	14.4	▼11.7	18,401	14.3	▼10.9
Greens	Johannes Wagner	10,942	8.5	▼0.1	9,603	7.5	▼1.8
FW	Nikolai Hiesl	6,943	5.4	▼2.1	5,071	4.0	▼2.2
Left	Gustav Müller	5,018	3.9	▲2.0	6,965	5.4	▲2.9
BSW	René Jens Hähnlein	2,838	2.2		4,314	3.4	
FDP	Oliver Ramm	2,489	1.9	▼3.2	4,135	3.2	▼5.5
APT					1,181	0.9	▼0.3
Volt					705	0.5	▲0.4
PARTEI					496	0.4	▼0.5
ÖDP	Carmen Greiff	973	0.8	▼0.4	450	0.4	▼0.2
dieBasis					387	0.3	▼1.2
BP					120	0.1	▼0.1
BD					122	0.1	
Humanists					103	0.1	Steady
MLPD					33	0.0	Steady
Informal votes		627			495		
Total valid votes		128,175			128,307		
Turnout		128,802	84.0	▲4.9			
CSU hold	Majority	26,905	21.0	▲10.6			

=== 2021 election ===
Federal election (2021): Coburg
Notes:	Blue background denotes the winner of the electorate vote. Pink background denotes a candidate elected from their party list. Yellow background denotes an electorate win by a list member, or other incumbent. A ✓ or ✗ denotes status of any incumbent, win or lose respectively.						
Party	Candidate	Votes	%	±%	Party votes	%	±%
CSU	Jonas Geissler	44,890	36.5	▼8.7	39,343	31.9	▼7.7
SPD	Ramona Brehm	32,056	26.1	▼0.4	31,087	25.2	▲2.7
AfD	Sebastian Görtler	11,878	9.7	▼0.8	12,836	10.4	▼1.2
Greens	Johannes Wagner	10,581	8.6	▲2.7	11,459	9.3	▲2.6
FW	Rainer Möbus	9,235	7.5		7,524	6.1	▲4.1
FDP	Jens-Uwe Peter	6,369	5.2	▲0.4	10,683	8.7	▲0.5
Left	Ulf Wunderlich	2,337	1.9	▼3.3	3,118	2.5	▼3.1
dieBasis	Nicole Fredriksen	2,002	1.6		1,869	1.5	
PARTEI	Tim Ströhlein	1,872	1.5		1,144	0.9	▲0.3
ÖDP	Tristan Wolf	1,418	1.2	▼0.2	673	0.5	0.0
Tierschutzpartei					1,509	1.2	▲0.3
BP	Andre Wächter	222	0.2		188	0.2	0.0
Pirates					343	0.3	0.0
Team Todenhöfer					256	0.2	
Gesundheitsforschung					167	0.1	0.0
Unabhängige					162	0.1	
Volt					162	0.1	
NPD					139	0.1	▼0.3
Humanists					122	0.1	
Bündnis C					109	0.1	
V-Partei3					80	0.1	0.0
The III. Path					65	0.1	
du.					52	0.0	
MLPD	Stefan Engel	83	0.1	0.0	43	0.0	0.0
LKR					20	0.0	
DKP					7	0.0	0.0
Informal votes		921			704		
Total valid votes		122,943			123,160		
Turnout		123,864	79.1	▲1.9			
CSU hold	Majority	12,834	10.4	▼8.3			

=== 2017 election ===
Federal election (2017): Coburg
Notes:	Blue background denotes the winner of the electorate vote. Pink background denotes a candidate elected from their party list. Yellow background denotes an electorate win by a list member, or other incumbent. A ✓ or ✗ denotes status of any incumbent, win or lose respectively.						
Party	Candidate	Votes	%	±%	Party votes	%	±%
CSU	✓ Hans Michelbach	55,078	45.3	▼4.9	48,410	39.6	▼7.1
SPD	Doris Aschenbrenner	32,163	26.4	▼6.0	27,553	22.6	▼5.4
AfD	Martin Böhm	12,763	10.5	▲7.7	14,208	11.6	▼7.4
Greens	Michael Eckstein	7,129	5.9	▲2.0	8,155	6.7	▲1.0
Left	René Hähnlein	6,305	5.2	▲1.8	6,895	5.6	▲1.7
FDP	Alexander Arnold	5,877	4.8	▲3.2	9,967	8.2	▲4.1
FW					2,449	2.0	▼0.2
Tierschutzpartei					1,135	0.9	▲0.3
PARTEI					829	0.7	
ÖDP	Christoph Raabs	1,659	1.4		637	0.5	0.0
NPD	Johannes Hühnlein	583	0.5	▼1.1	560	0.5	▼1.0
Pirates					387	0.3	▼1.3
BP					236	0.2	▼0.1
DiB					156	0.1	
Gesundheitsforschung					138	0.1	
DM					131	0.1	
V-Partei³					130	0.1	
BGE					107	0.1	
MLPD	Stefan Engel	136	0.1		71	0.1	0.0
BüSo					13	0.0	0.0
DKP					12	0.0	
Informal votes		1,507			1,021		
Total valid votes		121,693			122,179		
Turnout		123,200	77.2	▲7.6			
CSU hold	Majority	22,915	18.9	▲1.2			

=== 2013 election ===
Federal election (2013): Coburg
Notes:	Blue background denotes the winner of the electorate vote. Pink background denotes a candidate elected from their party list. Yellow background denotes an electorate win by a list member, or other incumbent. A ✓ or ✗ denotes status of any incumbent, win or lose respectively.						
Party	Candidate	Votes	%	±%	Party votes	%	±%
CSU	✓ Hans Michelbach	55,309	50.1	▲1.7	51,567	46.7	▲3.7
SPD	Norbert Tessmer	35,785	32.4	▲7.1	30,708	27.8	▲4.4
Greens	Manuel Dethloff	4,274	3.9	▼4.4	6,309	5.7	▼1.9
Left	René Hähnlein	3,681	3.3	▼3.2	4,415	4.0	▼3.1
AfD	Stefan Zubcic	3,143	2.8		4,730	4.3	
FW	Uwe Zipfel	2,909	2.6		2,435	2.2	
FDP	Ulrich Herbert	1,835	1.7	▼6.1	4,469	4.0	▼7.6
NPD	Gerhard Reuter	1,740	1.6	▼0.9	1,621	1.5	▼0.6
Pirates	Johannes Reichhardt	1,717	1.6		1,785	1.6	▼0.2
Tierschutzpartei					678	0.6	▲0.1
ÖDP					536	0.5	▼0.1
BP					305	0.3	0.0
DIE FRAUEN					243	0.2	
REP					218	0.2	▼0.3
DIE VIOLETTEN					109	0.1	0.0
Party of Reason					99	0.1	
PRO					62	0.1	
MLPD					39	0.0	0.0
RRP					25	0.0	▼0.2
BüSo					17	0.0	▼0.1
Informal votes		985			1,008		
Total valid votes		110,393			110,370		
Turnout		111,378	69.6	▼1.6			
CSU hold	Majority	19,524	17.7	▼5.4			

=== 2009 election ===
Federal election (2009): Coburg
Notes:	Blue background denotes the winner of the electorate vote. Pink background denotes a candidate elected from their party list. Yellow background denotes an electorate win by a list member, or other incumbent. A ✓ or ✗ denotes status of any incumbent, win or lose respectively.						
Party	Candidate	Votes	%	±%	Party votes	%	±%
CSU	✓ Hans Michelbach	55,174	48.4	▼3.6	49,248	43.0	▼2.5
SPD	Carl-Christian Dressel	28,882	25.3	▼7.9	26,869	23.5	▼9.5
Greens	Wolfgang Weiß	9,380	8.2	▲3.0	8,707	7.6	▲2.5
FDP	Ulrich Herbert	8,805	7.7	▲3.9	13,398	11.7	▲3.5
Left	Uwe Hiksch	7,475	6.6	▲3.3	8,116	7.1	▲3.3
NPD	Günter Kursawe	2,775	2.4	▼0.1	2,384	2.1	▼0.2
Pirates					2,093	1.8	
FAMILIE					711	0.6	▼0.1
ÖDP	Tanja Pfisterer	1,234	1.1		697	0.6	
REP					614	0.5	▼0.1
Tierschutzpartei					597	0.5	
Independent	Markus Häßler	342	0.3				
RRP					302	0.3	
BP					261	0.2	▲0.1
PBC					231	0.2	0.0
DIE VIOLETTEN					165	0.1	
CM					70	0.1	
DVU					56	0.0	
MLPD					35	0.0	0.0
BüSo					25	0.0	0.0
Informal votes		1,784			1,272		
Total valid votes		114,067			114,579		
Turnout		115,851	71.1	▼6.7			
CSU hold	Majority	26,292	23.1	▲4.3			

=== 2005 election ===
Federal election (2005):Coburg
Notes:	Blue background denotes the winner of the electorate vote. Pink background denotes a candidate elected from their party list. Yellow background denotes an electorate win by a list member, or other incumbent. A ✓ or ✗ denotes status of any incumbent, win or lose respectively.						
Party	Candidate	Votes	%	±%	Party votes	%	±%
CSU	✓ Hans Michelbach	63,352	52.0	▲3.8	57,476	45.5	▼6.9
SPD	Carl-Christian Dressel	41,705	33.2	▼11.3	41,691	33.0	▼3.0
Greens	Wolfgang Weiß	6,580	5.2	▲2.3	6,468	5.1	▲0.4
FDP	Roswitha Jäger	4,803	3.8	▲0.2	10,348	8.2	▲3.9
Left	Markus Bansemir	4,073	3.2	▲2.5	4,732	3.7	▲3.0
NPD	Günter Kursawe	3,175	2.5		2,886	2.3	▲1.8
REP					795	0.6	▲0.2
Familie					718	0.6	
Feminist					342	0.3	▲0.2
PBC					313	0.2	▲0.1
GRAUEN					309	0.2	▲0.2
BP					224	0.2	▲0.1
MLPD					99	0.1	
BüSo					57	0.0	0.0
Informal votes		2,391			1,621		
Total valid votes		125,688			126,458		
Turnout		128,079	7.8	▼3.8			
CSU hold	Majority	23,647	18.8				
