= Muddy Creek (Linn County, Oregon) =

- Location of the mouth of Muddy Creek in Oregon

Location
- Country: United States
- State: Oregon
- County: Linn and Lane

Physical characteristics
- Source: Coburg Ridge
  - location: near Coburg, Lane County
  - coordinates: 44°07′19″N 123°00′04″W
  - elevation: 1,611 ft (491 m)
- Mouth: Willamette River
  - location: East Channel, Linn County
  - coordinates: 44°32′14″N 123°13′19″W
  - elevation: 210 ft (64 m)

Muddy Creek is a tributary of the Willamette River that flows through parts of Lane and Linn counties in the U.S. state of Oregon. It begins near Coburg Ridge, northeast of Eugene, and meanders north across the floor of the Willamette Valley roughly parallel to the river. It joins the East Channel of the Willamette upstream of Corvallis.

Muddy Creek was so named by pioneer settlers on account of its muddy waters. Its entry in Oregon Geographic Names says, "It is a sluggish stream, and it is no surprise that the pioneers named it as they did." The name appeared in print as early as 1857.

The creek's main tributaries are Dry Muddy Creek and Little Muddy Creek. A different Muddy Creek with the same characteristics but on the other (western) side of the Willamette flows into Marys River, which enters the Willamette at Corvallis.

== See also ==
- List of rivers of Oregon
