= Coburg Historic District =

Historic district in Oregon, United States

- U.S. National Register of Historic Places
- U.S. Historic district
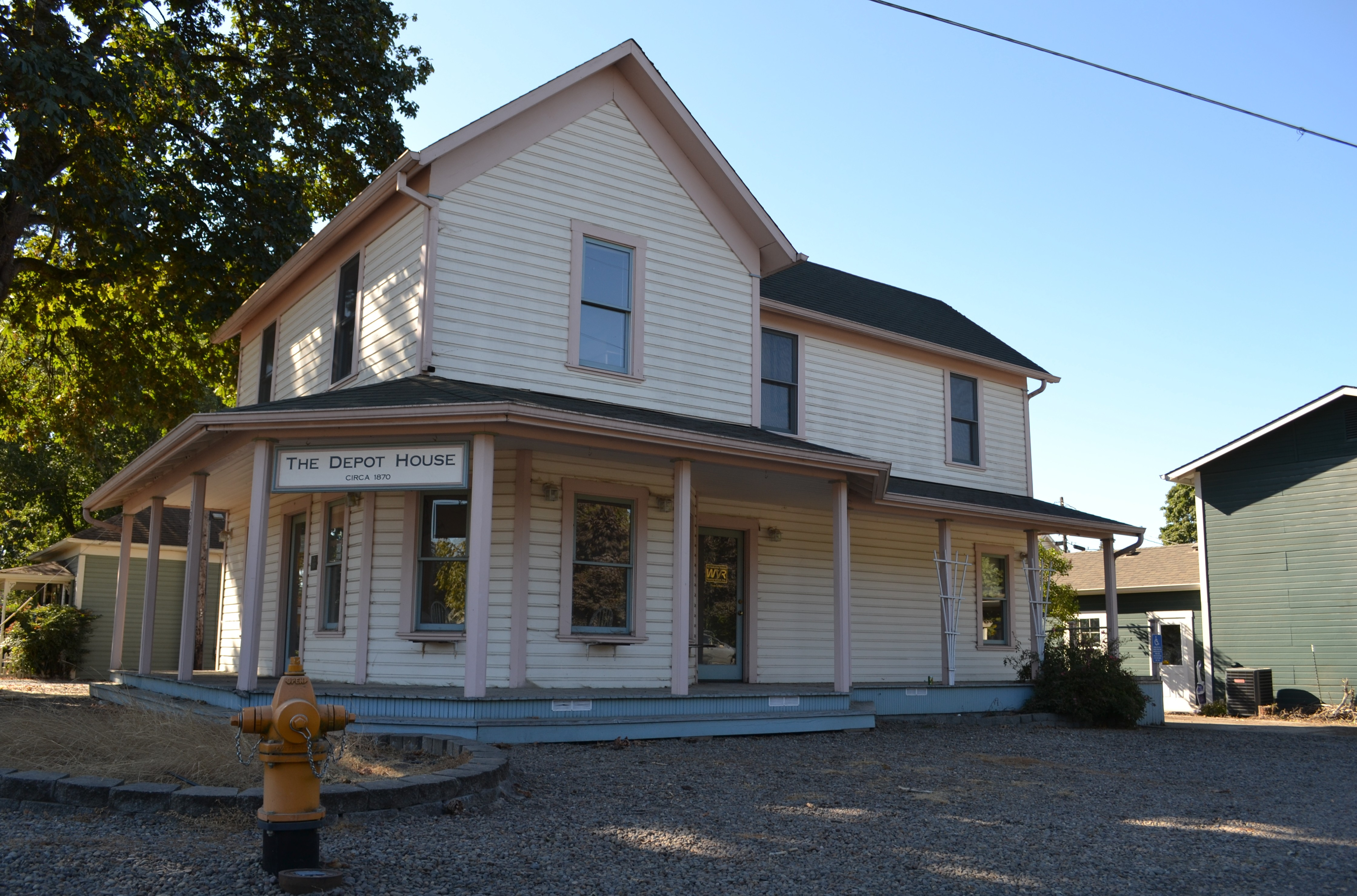
- The 1870 stagecoach house, and later railroad station house, at the corner of McKenzie and Harrison Streets in 2011.

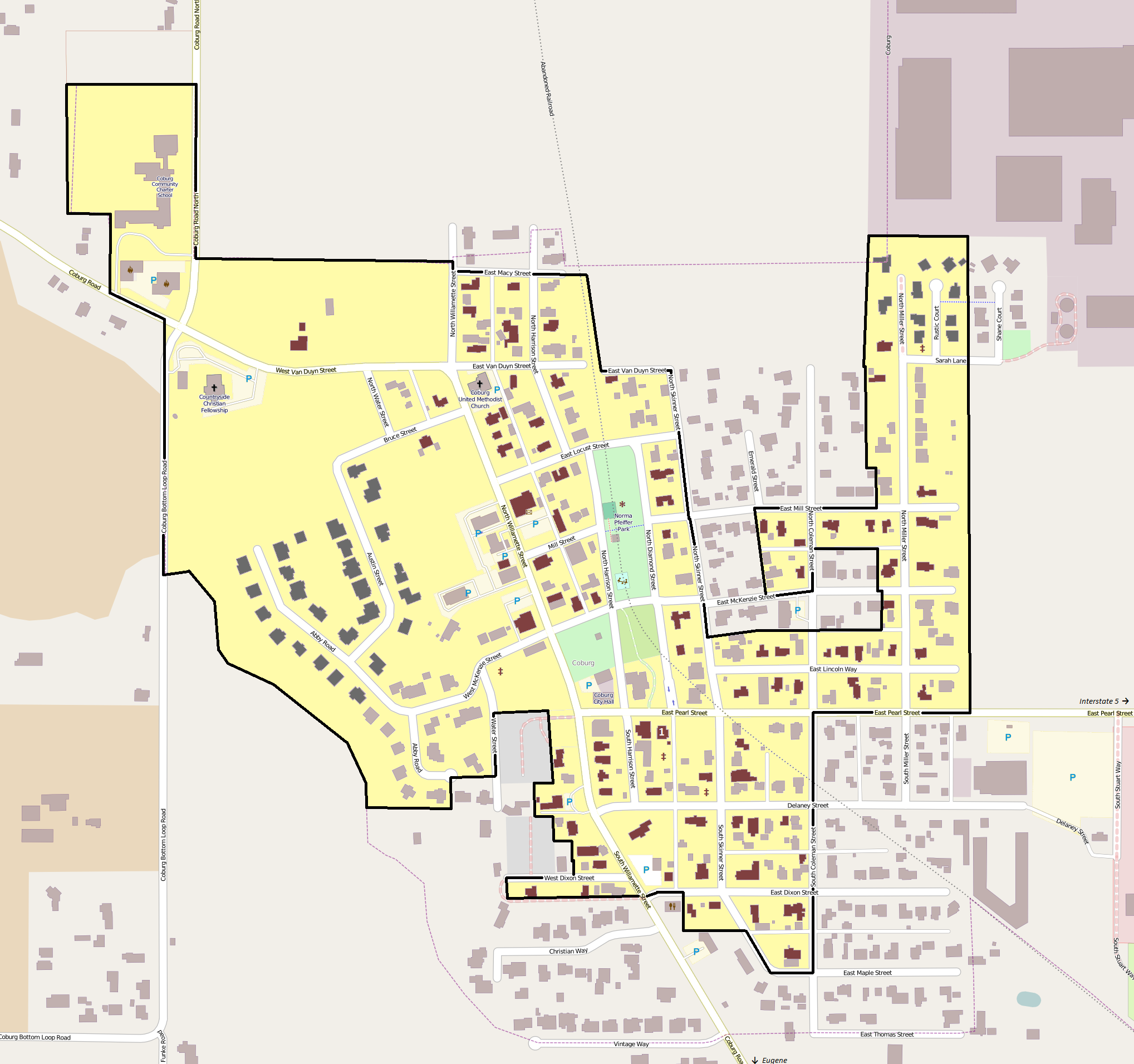
- Map of the district boundaries, showing historic contributing buildings and resources.
- Location: Coburg, Oregon
- Coordinates: 44.137293°N 123.063579°W
- NRHP reference No.: 86000036
- Added to NRHP: January 7, 1986

The Coburg Historic District is a National Historic District located in the city of Coburg, Oregon, United States. The district is roughly bounded by Van Duyn Road, Diamond and Miller streets, Dixon Street and Tax lots 1700 and 201, and Bottom Loop Road.

The district was placed on the National Register of Historic Places in 1986. The period of significance of the district dates back to 1875.
