= Mud Lake (Highlands County, Florida) =

Lake in the state of Florida, United States

- Paulie's Lake
- Location within Florida Location within the United States
- Location: Highlands County, Florida
- Coordinates: 27°33′47″N 81°25′44″W
- Type: natural freshwater lake
- Basin countries: United States
- Max. length: 2,250 ft (686 m)
- Max. width: 1,000 ft (305 m)
- Surface area: 32.5 acres (13 ha)
- Surface elevation: 98 feet (30 m)

This particular Mud Lake is located in Highlands County, Florida. "Mud Lake" is a very common name for lakes in the United States and Canada. Possibly 1,000 lakes are named Mud Lake in these two countries. Even in Florida at least twenty-three lakes are named "Mud Lake." The Highlands Ridge website refers to the area of the lake as Paulie's Lake. The main body of this Mud Lake is oval in shape. This part of the lake measures 1,500 ft (457 m) by 1,000 ft (305 m). The tail is 750 ft (229 m) by 100 ft (30 m). Mud Lake's surface area is 32.5-acre (132,000 m^{2}). This lake more resembles a swamp than it does a lake.

Highlands Ridge is retirement housing developments and two golf courses. The northern part of Highlands Ridge has housing just beyond the south side of Mud Lake. The northern Highlands Ridge golf course almost totally surrounds the lake. There is no public road access to this lake, as Highlands Ridge is a gated community. HookandBullet.Com provides a bit of fishing information. It says the lake contains sturgeon, gar and bluegill.
