= Mud Lake (Louisiana) =

Mud Lake (French: Lac Boue) within the U.S. state of Louisiana may refer to:

- Mud Lake, Calcasieu Parish, Louisiana 30°04′07″N 93°19′31″W
- Mud Lake, Calcasieu Parish, Louisiana 30°06′36″N 93°39′55″W
- Mud Lake, Cameron Parish, Louisiana 29°48′33″N 93°27′56″W
- Mud Lake, Cameron Parish, Louisiana 29°56′33″N 92°50′46″W
- Mud Lake, Concordia Parish, Louisiana 31°07′03″N 91°40′27″W
- Mud Lake, Concordia Parish, Louisiana 31°38′32″N 91°26′39″W
- Mud Lake, Morehouse Parish, Louisiana 32°53′57″N 92°04′27″W
- Mud Lake, St. Mary Parish, Louisiana 29°34′30″N 91°29′49″W
- Mud Lake, St. Mary Parish, Louisiana 29°45′14″N 91°35′21″W
- Mud Lake, Tensas Parish, Louisiana 32°03′22″N 91°11′54″W
- Mud Lake, Tensas Parish, Louisiana 32°13′10″N 91°13′12″W
- Mud Lake, Terrebonne Parish, Louisiana 29°17′09″N 90°54′42″W
- Mud Lake, Vermilion Parish, Louisiana 29°46′58″N 92°07′23″W
- Mud Lake, West Feliciana Parish, Louisiana 30°40′12″N 91°18′42″W
