= Mud Lake (Wyoming) =

There are several lakes named Mud Lake within the U.S. state of Wyoming.

- Mud Lake, Big Horn County, Wyoming. 44°30′39″N 107°22′47″W
- Mud Lake, Fremont County, Wyoming. 43°20′13″N 109°25′42″W
- Mud Lake, Fremont County, Wyoming. 43°28′24″N 109°33′41″W
- Mud Lake, Fremont County, Wyoming. 43°41′57″N 109°57′15″W
- Mud Lake, Fremont County, Wyoming. 43°43′02″N 109°30′48″W
- Mud Lake, Natrona County, Wyoming. 43°02′12″N 106°11′42″W
- Mud Lake, Sublette County, Wyoming. 42°41′02″N 109°16′47″W
- Mud Lake, Sublette County, Wyoming. 42°41′27″N 110°32′04″W
- Halls Lake, also known as Mud Lake, Sublette County, Wyoming. 42°55′33″N 109°46′37″W
- Mud Lake, Sublette County, Wyoming. 43°22′27″N 109°56′05″W
- Mud Lake, Sublette County, Wyoming. 43°22′34″N 109°56′06″W
- Red Lake, also known as Mud Lake, Sweetwater County, Wyoming. 41°59′18″N 108°27′46″W
- Mud Lake, Sweetwater County, Wyoming. 42°04′49″N 108°10′50″W
- Mud Lake, Teton County, Wyoming. 43°52′42″N 110°13′53″W
