= Muddy Creek (Iowa River tributary) =

Stream in Iowa, U.S.

Coordinates: 41°41′41″N 91°32′58″W

Muddy Creek is a stream in the U.S. state of Iowa. It is a tributary to the Iowa River.

Muddy Creek was so named due to the muddy character of its waters.
