= Mud (disambiguation) =

Mud is a liquid or semi-liquid mixture of water and soil.

Mud or MUD may also refer to:

== Construction material ==
- Drilling fluid, commonly called drilling mud
- Joint compound, powdered gypsum mixed with water

== Film and television ==
- Mud (TV series), a BBC television program
- Mud (1997 film), a Bulgarian short film
- Mud (2012 film), a coming-of-age drama film directed by Jeff Nichols

== Music ==
- Mud (band), British glam rock band
- Mud (Whiskey Myers album), 2016
- Mud (Remi Wolf album), 2026
- "Mud" (song), by The Road Hammers from the album Wheels
- "Mud", a song by Giveon from the album Beloved
- "Mud", a song by Peaches from the album I Feel Cream

== Places ==
- Metropolitan Utilities District (MUD), Omaha, Nebraska
- Mud, West Virginia
- Mud village, Spiti, a village in Himachal Pradesh, India
- Mud, Iran, a city in South Khorasan Province
- Mud District, an administrative subdivision in South Khorasan Province
- Mud Rural District, an administrative subdivision in South Khorasan Province
- Mud-e Olya, a village in South Khorasan Province, Iran
- Mud (river), a river of Baden-Württemberg, Germany
- Mud River (disambiguation), several titles
- Municipal utility district, a special-purpose district in the United States that provides public utilities.

== Other uses ==
- Mark Grant (baseball) (born 1963), nicknamed "Mud", American baseball player and sportscaster
- Mesa de la Unidad Democrática, a Venezuelan electoral coalition
- Middle-Up-Down, a lead convention in contract bridge
- Multi-user dungeon, a multiplayer real-time virtual world (also Multi-user dimension, Multi-user dashboard, or Multi-user domain)

== See also ==
- MUD1, the first virtual world in video gaming
- MUD2, the successor to MUD1
- MUD Literary Club, originally "Mates of Ubud"
- Mudd, a surname
- Mudd Jeans, a women's clothing brand
