= Mud Lake (Alberta) =

Lakes in Alberta, Canada

There are several lakes named Mud Lake within the Canadian province of Alberta.

- Mud Lake, located near Fort Macleod, Municipal District of Willow Creek No. 26. 49°45′00″N 113°32′00″W
- Mud Lake, Banff National Park. 51°27′00″N 116°11′00″W
- Mud Lake, Kananaskis Improvement District. 50°47′00″N 115°19′00″W

This lake is located within the Peter Lougheed Provincial Park of Alberta.

- Mud Lake, Elk Island National Park. 53°36′00″N 112°51′00″W
- Mud Lake, located near Grosmont, Athabasca County. 54°54′00″N 113°29′00″W
- Mud Lake, located near Conner Creek, Division No. 13, Alberta. 54°09′00″N 115°03′00″W
- Mud Lake, Wood Buffalo National Park. 58°47′00″N 111°20′00″W
