= Mud Lake (Minnesota) =

There are many lakes named Mud Lake in the U.S. state of Minnesota, including:

- Mud Lake (MN-01002900), Aitkin County, Minnesota.
- Mud Lake (MN-02003700), Anoka County, Minnesota.
- Mud Lake (MN-02006000), Anoka County, Minnesota.
- Mud Lake (MN-02009700), Anoka County, Minnesota.
- Mud Lake (MN-03002300), Becker County, Minnesota.
- Mud Lake (MN-03012000), Becker County, Minnesota.
- Mud Lake (MN-03031600), Becker County, Minnesota.
- Mud Lake (MN-07003400), Blue Earth County, Minnesota.
- Mud Lake (MN-07006500), Blue Earth County, Minnesota.
- Mud Lake (MN-10009400), Carver County, Minnesota.
- Mud Lake (MN-11010000), Cass County, Minnesota.
- Mud Lake (MN-11038500), Cass County, Minnesota.
- Mud Lake (MN-15007600), Clearwater County, Minnesota.
- Mud Lake (MN-18009400), Crow Wing County, Minnesota.
- Mud Lake (MN-18013700), Crow Wing County, Minnesota.
- Mud Lake (MN-18016600), Crow Wing County, Minnesota.
- Mud Lake (MN-18019800), Crow Wing County, Minnesota.
- Mud Lake (MN-18032100), Crow Wing County, Minnesota.
- Mud Lake (MN-18032600), Crow Wing County, Minnesota.
- Mud Lake (MN-18039100), Crow Wing County, Minnesota.
- Mud Lake (MN-21008600), Douglas County, Minnesota.
- Mud Lake (MN-21022500), Douglas County, Minnesota.
- Mud Lake (MN-27011200), Hennepin County, Minnesota, near Osseo.
- Mud Lake (MN-27018600), Minnestrista, Hennepin County, Minnesota.
- Mud Lake (MN-29000400), Hubbard County, Minnesota.
- Mud Lake (MN-29025100), Hubbard County, Minnesota.
- Mud Lake (MN-30011700), Isanti County, Minnesota.
- Mud Lake (MN-31011000), Itasca County, Minnesota.
- Mud Lake (MN-31020600), Itasca County, Minnesota.
- Mud Lake (MN-31035200), Itasca County, Minnesota.
- Mud Lake (MN-31075000), Itasca County, Minnesota.
- Mud Lake (MN-34015800), Kandiyohi County, Minnesota.
- Mud Lake (MN-38074200), Lake County, Minnesota.
- Mud Lake (MN-40002100), Montgomery Township of Le Sueur County, Minnesota.
- Mud Lake (MN-40002600), Lanesburg Township of Le Sueur County, Minnesota.
- Mud Lake (MN-40007400), Cordova Township of Le Sueur County, Minnesota.
- Mud Lake (MN-40008000), northwestern Lexington Township of Le Sueur County, Minnesota.
- Mud Lake (MN-40008300), northeastern Lexington Township of Le Sueur County, Minnesota.
- Mud Lake (MN-40008600), southeastern Lexington Township of Le Sueur County, Minnesota.
- Mud Lake (MN-40009300), on the Cordova-Cleveland Townships line of Le Sueur County, Minnesota.
- Huoy Lake, also known as Mud Lake in Cleveland Township of Le Sueur County, Minnesota.
- Mud Lake (MN-40011100), Cleveland Township of Le Sueur County, Minnesota.
- Mud Lake (MN-46003500), Martin County, Minnesota.
- Mud Lake (MN-46007200), Martin County, Minnesota.
- Mud Lake (MN-43003300), McLeod County, Minnesota.
- Mud Lake (MN-43004100), McLeod County, Minnesota.
- Mud Lake (MN-47003100), Meeker County, Minnesota.
- Mud Lake (MN-47004000), Meeker County, Minnesota.
- Mud Lake (MN-47005900), Meeker County, Minnesota.
- Mud Lake (MN-52002500), Nicollet County, Minnesota.
- Mud Lake (MN-56002600), Otter Tail County, Minnesota.
- Mud Lake (MN-56022200), Otter Tail County, Minnesota.
- Mud Lake (MN-56058700), Otter Tail County, Minnesota.
- Mud Lake (MN-58001400), Pine County, Minnesota.
- Mud Lake (MN-58009000), Pine County, Minnesota.
- Mud Lake (MN-58010300), Pine County, Minnesota.
- Mud Lake (MN-65001700), Renville County, Minnesota.
- Mud Lake (MN-66002300), Rice County, Minnesota.
- Caron Lake, also known as Mud Lake in Rice County, Minnesota.
- Mud Lake (MN-66005400), Rice County, Minnesota.
- Mud Lake (MN-70004000), Scott County, Minnesota.
- Mud Lake (MN-72001800), Washington Lake Township of Sibley County, Minnesota.
- Mud Lake (MN-72004500), Dryden Township of Sibley County, Minnesota.
- Mud Lake (MN-72005100), Sibley County, Minnesota.
- Mud Lake (MN-72005500), New Auburn Township (southeast of Hahn Lake) of Sibley County, Minnesota.
- Mud Lake (MN-72005700), New Auburn Township (northwest of Hahn Lake) of Sibley County, Minnesota.
- Mud Lake (MN-72006800), a dry lakebed south of Winthrop in Sibley County, Minnesota.
- Mud Lake (MN-72009500), Severance Township of Sibley County, Minnesota.
- Mud Lake (MN-69027500), St. Louis County, Minnesota.
- Mud Lake (MN-69051200), St. Louis County, Minnesota.
- Mud Lake (MN-69056700), St. Louis County, Minnesota.
- Mud Lake (MN-69065200), St. Louis County, Minnesota.
- Mud Lake (MN-69080000), St. Louis County, Minnesota.
- Mud Lake (MN-73008100), Stearns County, Minnesota.
- Mud Lake (MN-73016100), Stearns County, Minnesota.
- Mud Lake (MN-73020001), Stearns County, Minnesota.
- Mud Lake (MN-73022500), Stearns County, Minnesota.
- Mud Lake (MN-77015100), Todd County, Minnesota.
- Mud Lake (MN-77016200), Todd County, Minnesota.
- Mud Lake (MN-78002400), Traverse County, Minnesota.
- Mud Lake (MN-81000500), Waseca County, Minnesota.
- Mud Lake (MN-82002600), Washington County, Minnesota.
- Mud Lake (MN-82016800), Washington County, Minnesota.
- Mud Lake (MN-83005000), Watonwan County, Minnesota.
- Mud Lake (MN-86002100), Wright County, Minnesota.
- Mud Lake (MN-86002600), Wright County, Minnesota.
- Mud Lake (MN-86004400), Wright County, Minnesota.
- Mud Lake (MN-86006800), Wright County, Minnesota.
- Mud Lake (MN-86008500), Wright County, Minnesota.
- Mud Lake (MN-86013402), Wright County, Minnesota.
- Mud Lake (MN-86021900), Wright County, Minnesota.
- Mud Lake (MN-86026600), Wright County, Minnesota.
- Meidd Lake, also known as Mud Lake in Yellow Medicine County, Minnesota.
