= Mud Creek (Gasconade River tributary) =

Stream in the US state of Missouri

Mud Creek is a stream in Gasconade and Osage counties of central Missouri. It is a tributary of the Gasconade River.

The stream headwaters are located in Osage County at 38°32′32″N 91°39′54″W and the confluence with the Gasconade in Gasconade County is at 38°32′03″N 91°37′19″W. The stream source lies north of Hope and it flows to the southeast to enter the flood plain and then turns north for about one mile before entering the main channel of the Gasconade.

Mud Creek was named for the muddy character of its water.

== See also ==
- List of rivers of Missouri
