= Muddy Brook =

Muddy Brook may refer to:

- Muddy Brook, Newfoundland and Labrador, a community in the town of Port Blandford in Newfoundland and Labrador, Canada
- A brook in Maberly, Newfoundland and Labrador, Canada
- A brook spanned by Bridge No. 1604 in Devil's Hopyard State Park in East Haddam, Connecticut, U.S.
- A tributary of Sandy River in Phillips, Maine, U.S.
- Sárospatak (Muddy Brook), a town in Borsod-Abaúj-Zemplén county, Hungary
