= Mud Lake (New Mexico) =

Lake in New Mexico, United States

- Location within New Mexico Location within the United States
- Location: Sierra County, New Mexico
- Coordinates: 33°04′30″N 107°45′30″W
- Basin countries: United States

Mud Lake, is a lake located in Sierra County within the U.S. state of New Mexico.
