= Mud Lake (Colorado) =

There are several lakes named Mud Lake in the U.S. state of Colorado.

- Mud Lake, Boulder County, Colorado. 39°58′40″N 105°30′36″W
- Mud Lake, Garfield County, Colorado. 39°57′06″N 107°07′07″W
- Mud Lake, Jackson County, Colorado. 40°26′04″N 106°22′00″W
- Mud Lake, Kiowa County, Colorado. 38°19′55″N 102°43′57″W
- Mud Lake, Larimer County, Colorado. 40°28′15″N 105°01′47″W
- Mud Lake, San Miguel County, Colorado. 37°53′53″N 107°45′34″W
- Mud Lake, San Miguel County, Colorado. 37°54′12″N 108°23′21″W
