= Mud Lake (Georgia) =

There are several lakes named Mud Lake within the U.S. state of Georgia.

- Mud Lake, Camden County, Georgia. 31°03′23″N 81°54′06″W
- Mud Lake, Charlton County, Georgia. 30°55′28″N 82°09′40″W
- Mud Lake, Lowndes County, Georgia. 30°42′13″N 83°27′22″W
- Mud Lake, Ware County, Georgia. 31°02′49″N 82°17′31″W
