= Mud Lake (Missouri) =

There are several lakes named Mud Lake within the U.S. state of Missouri.

- Mud Lake, Buchanan County, Missouri. 39°33′51″N 95°04′36″W
- Mud Lake, Platte County, Missouri. 39°20′06″N 94°52′25″W
- Mud Lake, St. Charles County, Missouri. 38°53′03″N 90°42′53″W
