= Koberg (Taunus) =

Hill in Hesse, Germany

Coordinates: 50°21′13″N 8°19′00″E

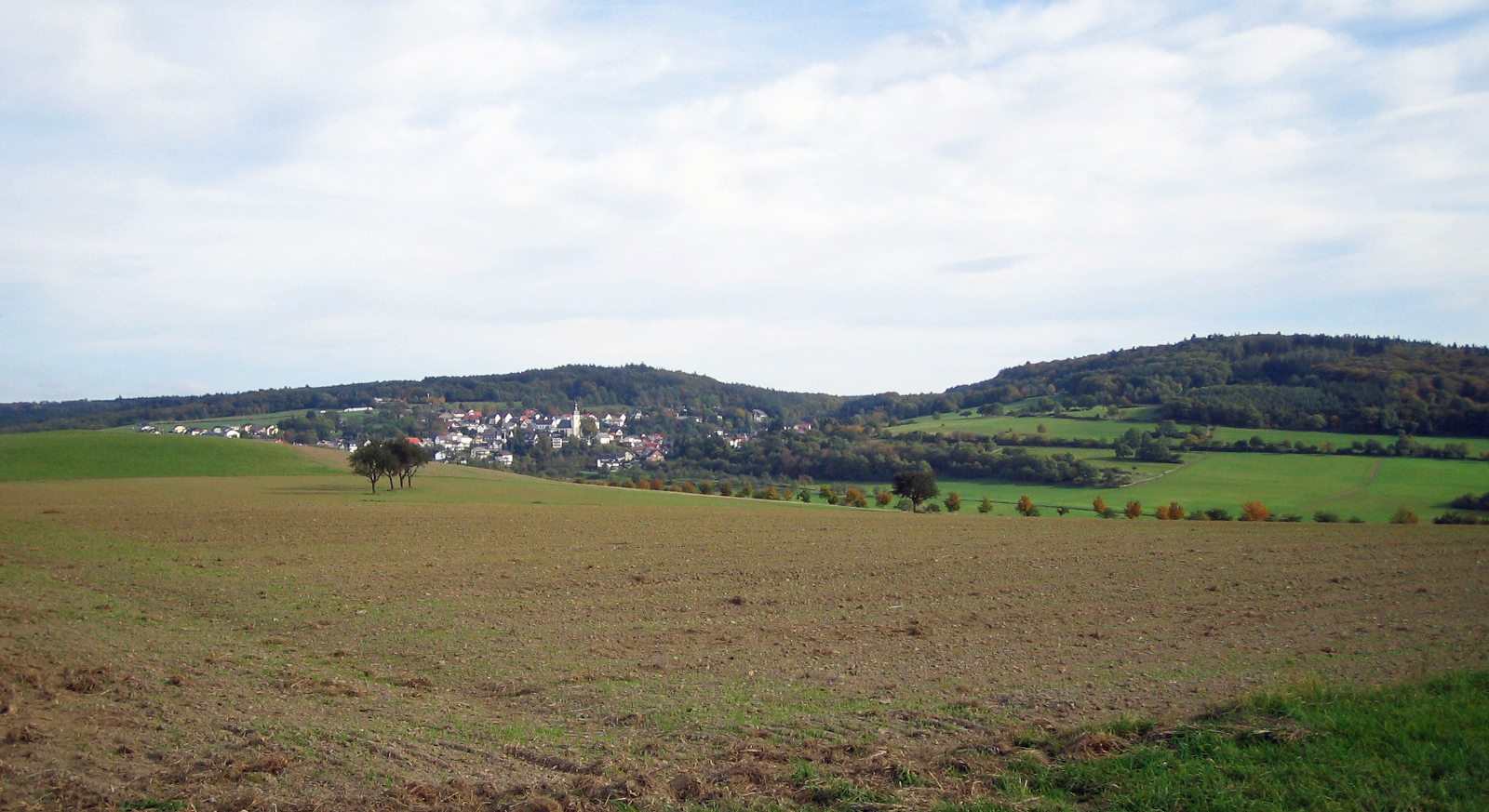
- Koberg

Highest point
- Elevation: 460.5 m (1,511 ft)

Geography
- Location: Hesse, Germany

Koberg (German pronunciation: [ˈkoːbɛʁk]) is a hill of Hesse, Germany.

== Geography ==
=== Location ===
The Koberg is located in the eastern Hintertaunus. In the Taunus Nature Park, it rises directly south of Haintchen, a district of the municipality of Selters (Taunus). The Eisenbach stream flows around the hill to the east and north. Around 0.8 km to the south is the 461.8 m high Suterkopf.

The wooded Koberg is part of the Feldberg-Langhals-Pferdskopf-Scholle, which separates the Emsbachtal from the Weiltal. Together with the Suterkopf and the Blumenstück (445 m), it forms the last northwestern mountains of this plateau.

=== Natural classification ===
The Koberg belongs to the Taunus main natural unit group (No. 30), in the main unit Östlicher Hintertaunus (302) to the Pferdskopf-Taunus natural area (302.6).
