= Muddy Creek (Cass County, Missouri) =

Stream in the US state of Missouri

Coordinates: 38°38′04″N 94°23′18″W

Muddy Creek is a stream in Cass County in the U.S. state of Missouri. It is a tributary of the South Grand River.

Muddy Creek was named for the muddy character of its water.

== See also ==
- List of rivers of Missouri
