= Mud, West Virginia =

- Unincorporated community
- Location within West Virginia Location within the United States
- Coordinates: 38°5′41″N 81°58′34″W
- Country: United States
- State: West Virginia
- County: Lincoln
- Elevation: 810 ft (250 m)
- Time zone: UTC-5 (Eastern (EST))
  - Summer (DST): UTC-4 (EDT)
- GNIS feature ID: 1543899

Mud is an unincorporated community in Lincoln County, West Virginia, United States. Its post office is closed.

The community was named after the nearby Mud River.
