= Mud Creek (Clear Creek tributary) =

Stream in Georgia, U.S.

Coordinates: 34°16′1.34″N 84°52′8.79″W

Mud Creek is a stream in the U.S. state of Georgia. It is a tributary to Clear Creek.

Mud Creek's name is descriptive.
