= Geroldsgrün =

Municipality in Hof, Bavaria, Germany

- Municipality
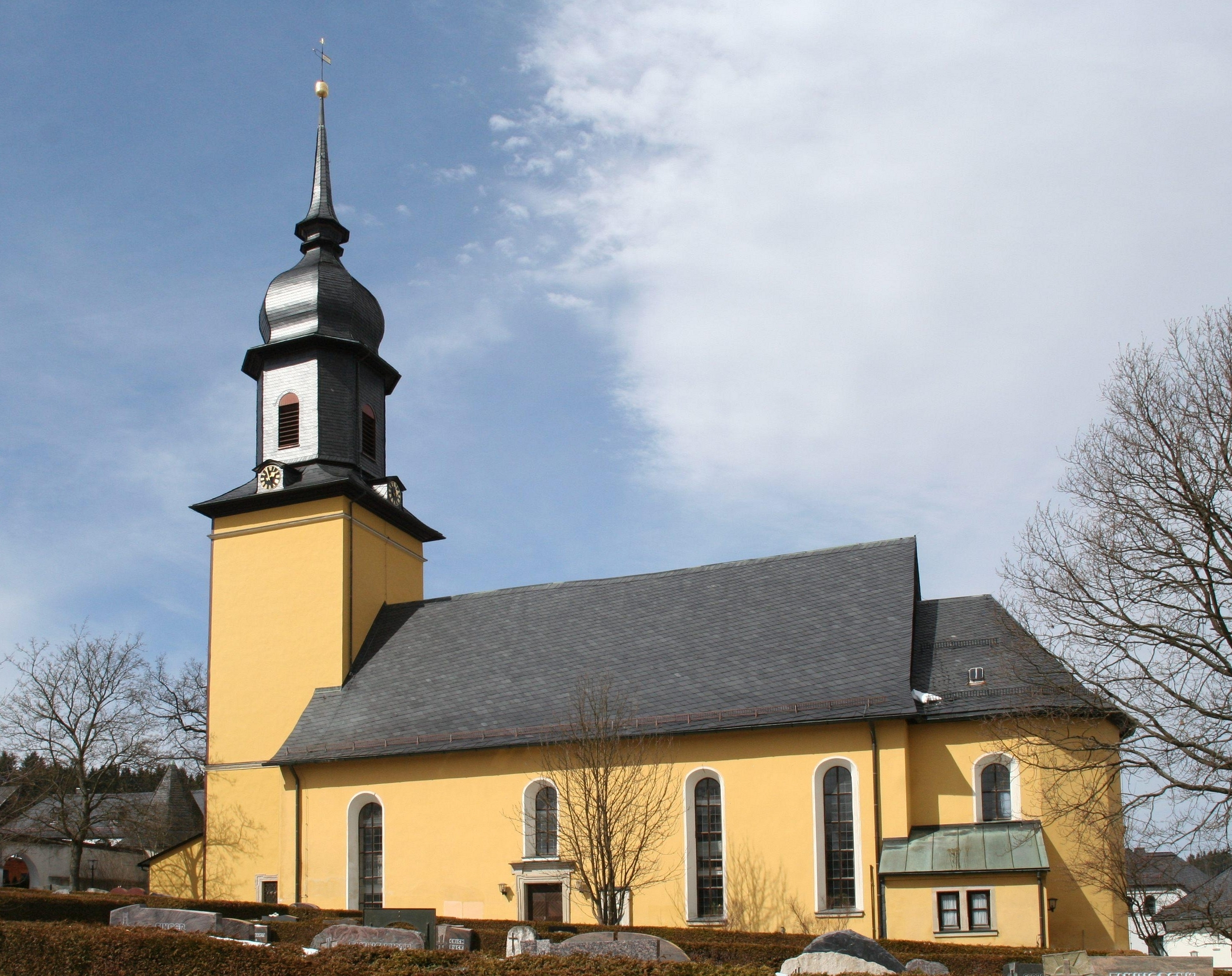
- Church of Saint James the Elder

- Coat of arms

- Location of Geroldsgrün within Hof district
- Interactive map of Geroldsgrün
- Location within Germany Location within Bavaria
- Coordinates: 50°20′N 11°35′E
- Country: Germany
- State: Bavaria
- Admin. region: Oberfranken
- District: Hof
- Subdivisions: 13 Boroughs

Government
  - Mayor (2020–26): Stefan Münch (CSU)

Area
  - Total: 15.57 km^{2} (6.01 sq mi)
- Elevation: 606 m (1,988 ft)

Population (2025-12-31)
  - Total: 2,598
  - Density: 166.9/km^{2} (432.2/sq mi)
- Time zone: UTC+01:00 (CET)
  - Summer (DST): UTC+02:00 (CEST)
- Postal codes: 95179
- Dialling codes: 09288 and 09267
- Vehicle registration: HO
- Website: www.geroldsgruen.de

Geroldsgrün is a municipality in the Hof district of Bavaria, Germany.

== Geography ==
=== Boroughs ===
- Dürrenwaid
- Dürrenwaiderhammer
- Langenbachtal
- Langenau
- Langenbach
- Lotharheil
- Mühlleiten
- Geroldsgrün
- Geroldsreuth
- Großenreuth
- Hermesgrün
- Hertwegsgrün
- Hirschberglein
- Silberstein
- Steinbach
- Untersteinbach

The boroughs of Geroldsgrün for the most part are registered air health resorts.

== History ==
The earliest mention of the town is 1323 as Gerhartsgrün. Until recently Geroldsgrün always has been a bordertown between various dominions. In the past it was on the border of the Archdiocese of Bamberg to Grafen von Orlamünde, later between the diocese and Margravate Bayreuth-Kulmbach and in recent times until the reunification between West and East Germany.

In 1972 the former municipality of Dürrenwaid becomes part of Geroldsgrün and with the dissolution of the district of Naila Geroldsgrün becomes part of the rural district of Hof. On 1 May 1978 Geroldsgrün reached its current size with the inclusion of Langenbach and Steinbach.

== Climate ==
The annual average temperature in Geroldsgrün is 6.7 °C and the average rainfall is 1,002 mm.
