= Mud Lake (Ohio) =

Lakes of Ohio, US

There are several lakes named Mud Lake within the U.S. state of Ohio.

- Mud Lake, Ashland County, Ohio. 40°56′58″N 82°21′29″W
- Mud Lake, Stark County, Ohio. 40°52′54″N 81°08′42″W
- Mud Lake, Summit County, Ohio. 40°58′12″N 81°31′53″W
- Mud Lake, Summit County, Ohio. 41°13′45″N 81°28′18″W
- Mud Lake, Williams County, Ohio. 41°38′53″N 84°46′03″W
