= Mud Creek (Logan Creek tributary) =

Stream in the American state of Missouri

Coordinates: 38°42′28″N 91°46′56″W

Mud Creek is a stream in Callaway County in the U.S. state of Missouri. It is a tributary of Logan Creek.

Mud Creek was so named on account of frequently muddy water.

== See also ==
- List of rivers of Missouri
