= Mud Lake (Washington) =

There are over 30 lakes named Mud Lake within the U.S. state of Washington.

- Green Lake, also known as Mud Lake, Adams County, Washington. 47°09′41″N 118°01′26″W
- Mud Lake, Clallam County, Washington. 47°57′29″N 123°43′37″W
- Cat Lake, also known as Mud Lake, Clallam County, Washington. 48°04′05″N 122°58′15″W
- Mud Lake, also known as Lake Rosannah, Clark County, Washington. 45°51′29″N 122°44′00″W
- Mud Lake, Ferry County, Washington. 48°30′45″N 118°12′27″W
- Mud Lake, Ferry County, Washington. 48°40′20″N 118°45′56″W
- Mud Lake, Jefferson County, Washington. 47°51′14″N 122°42′55″W
- Mud Lake, King County, Washington. 47°16′24″N 122°18′38″W
- Mud Lake, King County, Washington. 47°19′03″N 121°59′36″W
- Shady Lake, also known as Mud Lake, King County, Washington. 47°25′46″N 122°06′22″W
- Mud Lake, King County, Washington. 47°39′35″N 121°44′32″W
- Totem Lake, also known as Mud Lake, King County, Washington. 47°42′37″N 122°10′30″W
- Mud Lake, Lewis County, Washington. 46°23′41″N 121°37′02″W
- Mud Lake, Okanogan County, Washington. 48°35′48″N 119°37′54″W
- Mud Lake, Okanogan County, Washington. 48°54′53″N 119°28′39″W
- Mud Lake, Okanogan County, Washington. 48°55′53″N 119°20′20″W
- Mud Lake, Okanogan County, Washington. 48°56′16″N 119°13′54″W
- Mud Lake, Pierce County, Washington. 46°55′17″N 122°18′26″W
- Waughop Lake, also known as Mud Lake, Pierce County, Washington. 47°10′13″N 122°33′53″W
- Mud Lake, Skagit County, Washington. 48°26′01″N 122°38′58″W
- Mud Lake, Skagit County, Washington. 48°27′45″N 122°14′16″W
- Grouse Lake, also known as Mud Lake, Snohomish County, Washington. 47°49′17″N 121°07′31″W
- Lake Serene, also known as Mud Lake, Snohomish County, Washington. 47°52′10″N 122°17′08″W
- Beverly Lake, also known as Mud Lake, Snohomish County, Washington. 47°55′54″N 122°13′31″W
- Mud Lake, Snohomish County, Washington. 48°08′52″N 121°55′43″W
- Mud Lake, Snohomish County, Washington. 48°09′23″N 122°01′13″W
- Mud Lake, Spokane County, Washington. 47°27′48″N 117°42′24″W
- Mud Lake, Stevens County, Washington. 48°16′44″N 117°39′21″W
- Mud Lake (Thurston County, Washington)
- Mud Lake, Whatcom County, Washington. 48°39′47″N 122°27′02″W
- Mud Lake, Whatcom County, Washington. 48°49′02″N 122°12′19″W
- Mud Lake, Whitman County, Washington. 47°11′11″N 117°39′52″W
- Mud Lake, Yakima County, Washington. 46°19′26″N 120°33′17″W
- Mud Lake, Yakima County, Washington. 46°46′20″N 120°50′05″W
- Little Mud Lake, also known as Mud Lake, Yakima County, Washington. 46°50′52″N 120°54′50″W
