= Mud Lake (Kentucky) =

There are several lakes named Mud Lake within the U.S. state of Kentucky.

- Butler Lake, also known as Mud Lake, Ballard County, Kentucky. 37°09′39″N 89°03′10″W
- Mud Lake, Crittenden County, Kentucky. 37°24′41″N 88°20′03″W
