= Mud Lake (Arizona) =

There are several lakes named Mud Lake in the U.S. state of Arizona:

- Mud Lake, Coconino County, Arizona. 34°55′22″N 111°21′20″W
- Mud Lake, Coconino County, Arizona. 35°03′23″N 110°54′22″W
- Mud Lake, Coconino County, Arizona. 36°38′07″N 112°17′38″W
