= Mud Creek (Noses Creek tributary) =

Stream in Georgia, U.S.

Coordinates: 33°53′23.37″N 84°38′21.76″W

Mud Creek is a stream in the U.S. state of Georgia. It is a tributary to Noses Creek.
