= Mud Lake (North Dakota) =

Lake in the state of North Dakota, United States

There are several lakes named Mud Lake within the U.S. state of North Dakota.

- Mud Lake, Barnes County, North Dakota. 46°51′27″N 98°25′33″W
- Mud Lake, Barnes County, North Dakota. 47°09′06″N 98°24′32″W
- Mud Lake, Benson County, North Dakota. 48°13′31″N 99°34′20″W
- Mud Lake, Benson County, North Dakota. 48°21′13″N 99°45′52″W
- Mud Lake, Bottineau County, North Dakota. 48°57′48″N 100°21′51″W
- Mud Lake, Bottineau County, North Dakota. 48°58′39″N 100°19′02″W
- Mud Lake, Kidder County, North Dakota. 46°40′46″N 100°01′49″W
- Mud Lake, Kidder County, North Dakota. 46°56′35″N 99°42′01″W
- Mud Lake, McIntosh County, North Dakota. 46°16′00″N 99°22′46″W
- Mud Lake, McLean County, North Dakota. 47°36′15″N 100°59′24″W
- Mud Lake, Sheridan County, North Dakota. 47°48′49″N 100°13′41″W
- Mud Lake, Stutsman County, North Dakota. 47°03′15″N 99°20′46″W
