= Muddy Creek (Daviess County, Missouri) =

Stream in the U.S. state of Missouri

Coordinates: 40°01′13″N 94°09′01″W

Muddy Creek is a stream in Daviess and DeKalb Counties in the U.S. state of Missouri. It is a tributary of the Grand River.

The stream headwaters arise in northeastern DeKalb County just south of the DeKalb-Gentry county line at . The stream flows south and then east passing one mile north of Santa Rosa as it enters Daviess County. The stream flows east and then turns northeast to enter the Grand River approximately two miles south-southwest of Pattonsburg at .

Muddy Creek most likely was named for its muddy waters.

== See also ==
- List of rivers of Missouri
