= Muddy Creek (Little Miami River tributary) =

Stream in Ohio, U.S.

Coordinates: 39°21′54″N 84°14′33″W

Muddy Creek is a stream in the U.S. state of Ohio. It is a tributary to the Little Miami River.

Muddy Creek was so named on account of the muddy character of its water.
