= Coburg Hills =

Range of foothills in Oregon, US

Coordinates: 44.125125°N 123.001474°W

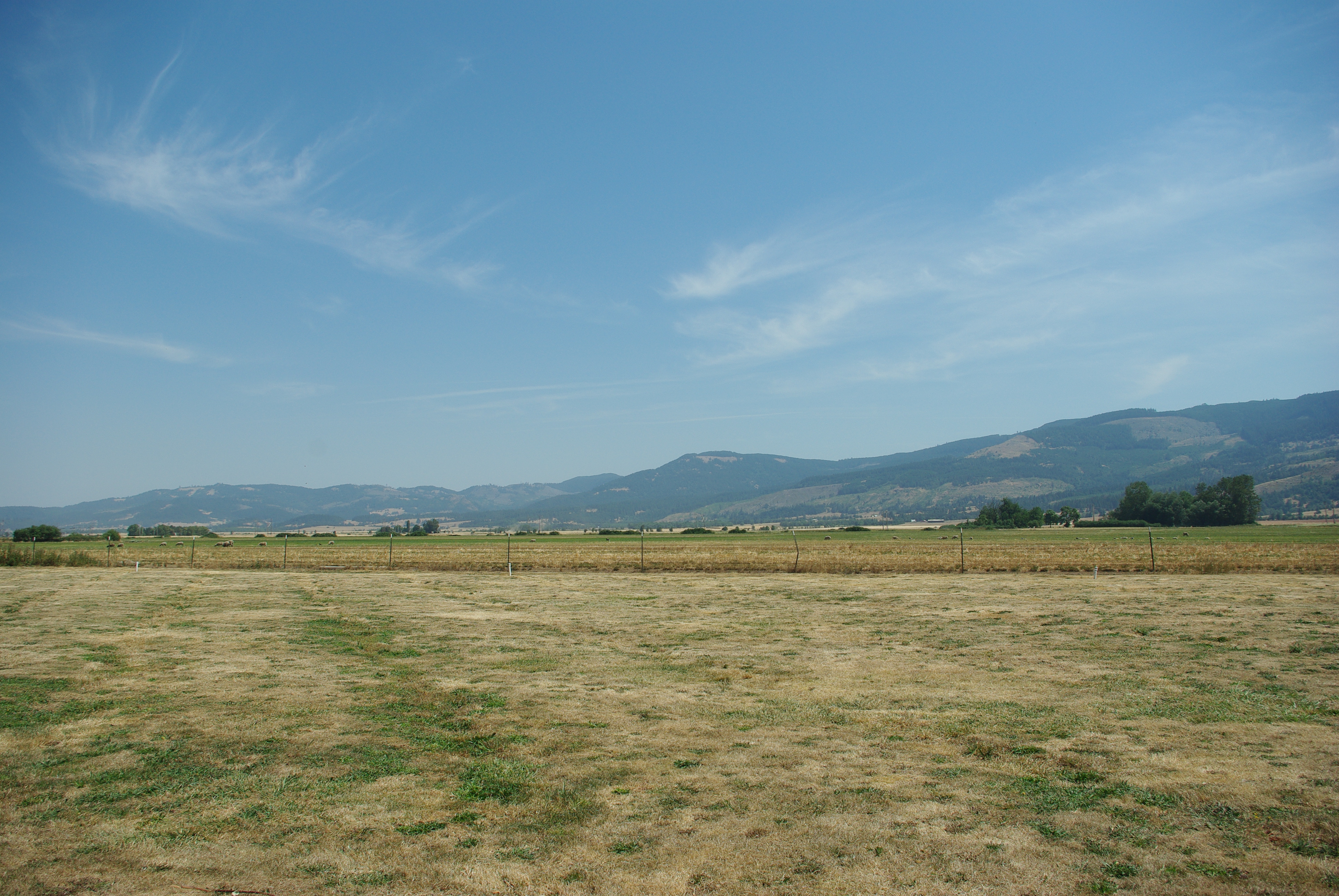
Coburg Hills from the Willamette Valley

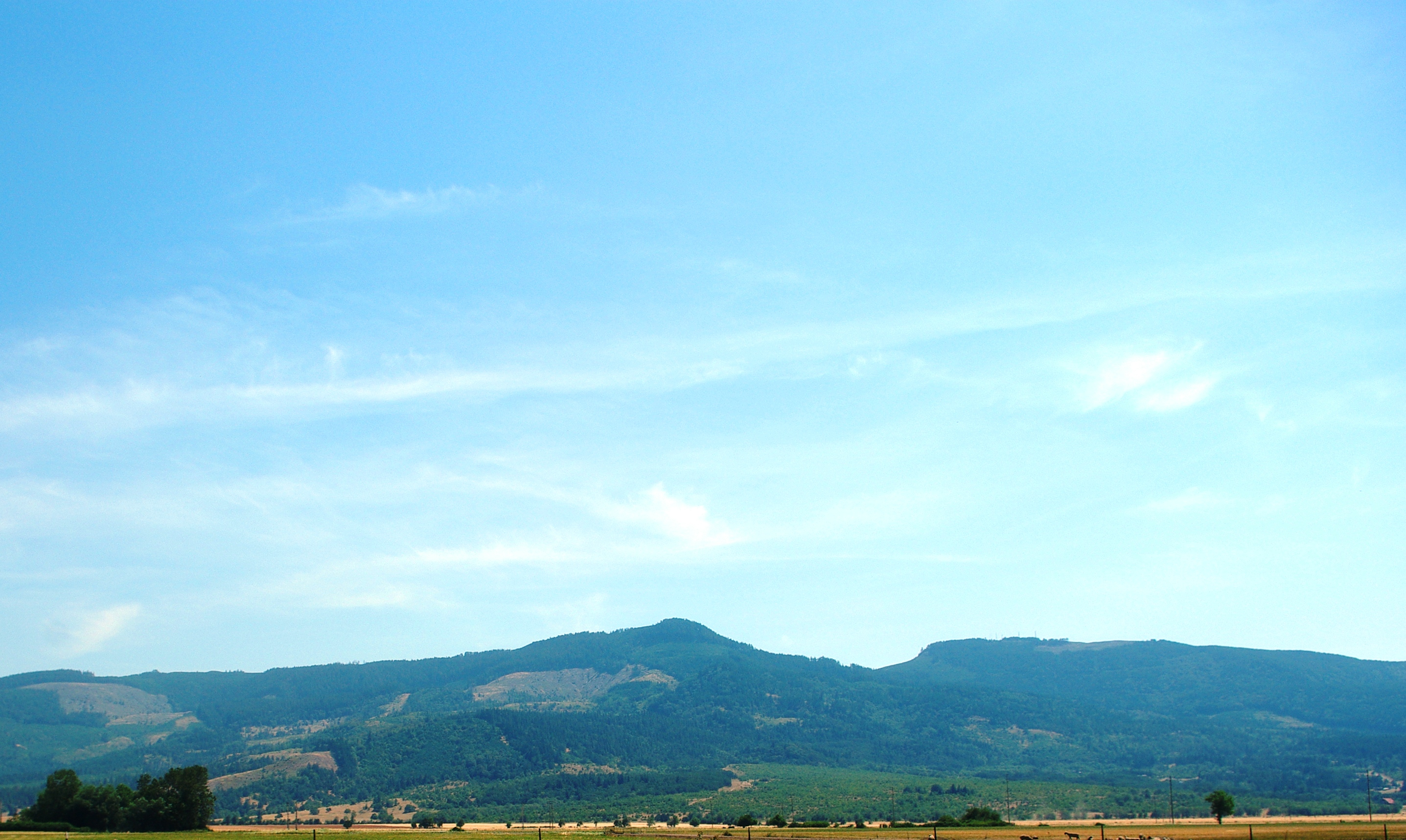
Saddle in the hills

The Coburg Hills are a range of foothills of the western Cascade Range of Lane and Linn counties in the U.S. state of Oregon. They are located northeast of Eugene and east of Coburg, between the Mohawk Valley and Willamette Valley.

== Topography ==
The Coburg Hills rise to an elevation of approximately 2,253 feet at Coburg Ridge.

One of the most notable features of the Coburg Hills is a gap or saddle at its north end called the Hayworth Saddle. This previously unnamed feature was officially named in 2008, after Register-Guard columnist Bob Welch asked readers for suggestions. Eventually, they voted for "Hayworth Ridge", after a local family who has been farming near there since 1875. The name was changed to "Hayworth Saddle" by the Oregon Geographic Names Board, which in turn recommended it to the U.S. Board on Geographic Names. The board adopted the name in September 2008.

Individual summits in the range include Spores Point, Buck Mountain, Mount Tom, Round Mountain, and Bald Mountain.
