= Gallant Lake (Alabama) =

- Mud Lake
- Location within Alabama Location within the United States
- Location: Tuscaloosa County, Alabama
- Coordinates: 33.2274°N 87.1798°W
- Type: natural freshwater lake
- Basin countries: United States
- Max. length: 1,920 feet (590 m)
- Max. width: 775 feet (236 m)
- Surface area: 20 acres (8.1 ha)
- Surface elevation: 525 ft (160 m)

Gallant Lake (also known as Mud Lake, Gallant Pond or Mud Pond) is a natural freshwater lake in Tuscaloosa County, Alabama. The eastern tip of Gallant Lake borders the right of way of Interstate 20.
