= Junipers Reservoir =

- Muddy Creek Reservoir
- Location within Oregon Location within the United States
- Location: Lake County, Oregon, United States
- Coordinates: 42°11′57″N 120°31′29″W
- Type: Reservoir
- Primary inflows: Muddy Creek
- Surface area: 170 acres (69 ha)
- Max. depth: 7.9 ft (2.4 m)
- Surface elevation: 4,872 ft (1,485 m)

Junipers Reservoir, also known as Muddy Creek Reservoir, is a man-made lake in Lake County, Oregon, United States, named for the junipers in the area. It is located south of Cottonwood Reservoir and about 8 miles (13 km) west of downtown Lakeview, next to an RV resort. Sitting at an elevation of 4,872 ft (1,485 m), the reservoir has a surface area of 170 acres (69 ha) and is no more than 7.9 ft (2.4 m) deep. Muddy Creek and two other streams flow into the lake. The catchment area is mostly pasture with some national forest land.

== See also ==
- List of lakes in Oregon
