= Mud Lake (Mississippi–Tennessee) =

Oxbow lake in Mississippi and Tennessee, United States

- Location within Mississippi Location within Tennessee Location within the United States
- Location: DeSoto County, Mississippi / Shelby County, Tennessee, United States
- Coordinates: 34°59′45″N 90°12′26″W
- Basin countries: United States
- Surface elevation: 190 ft (58 m)

Mud Lake is an oxbow lake located in northwestern DeSoto County, Mississippi, and in southwestern Shelby County, Tennessee. It was created by changes in the flow of the Mississippi River and borders Horn Lake (Tennessee) to the east. The lake was formerly accessible to the public. However, all surrounding land was purchased by Ensley Bottom Farms LLC thereby eliminating public access. The area has been turned into a private hunting and fishing club depriving many citizens from what was formerly a public lake used by many.
