= Muddy River =

Muddy River may refer to:

== Streams ==
- Muddy River (Massachusetts), a series of brooks and ponds that runs through sections of Boston's Emerald Necklace
- Muddy River (Merrymeeting Bay), a river in Maine
- Muddy River (Nevada), a river in Nevada
- Muddy River (Sebago Lake), a river in Maine
- Muddy River (Washington), a river in the state of Washington

== Other ==
- Muddy River (film), a 1981 Japanese film

== See also ==
- Brookline, Massachusetts, formerly named Muddy River
- Muddy Creek (disambiguation)
- Muddy (disambiguation)
