= Coburg, Oregon =

- City
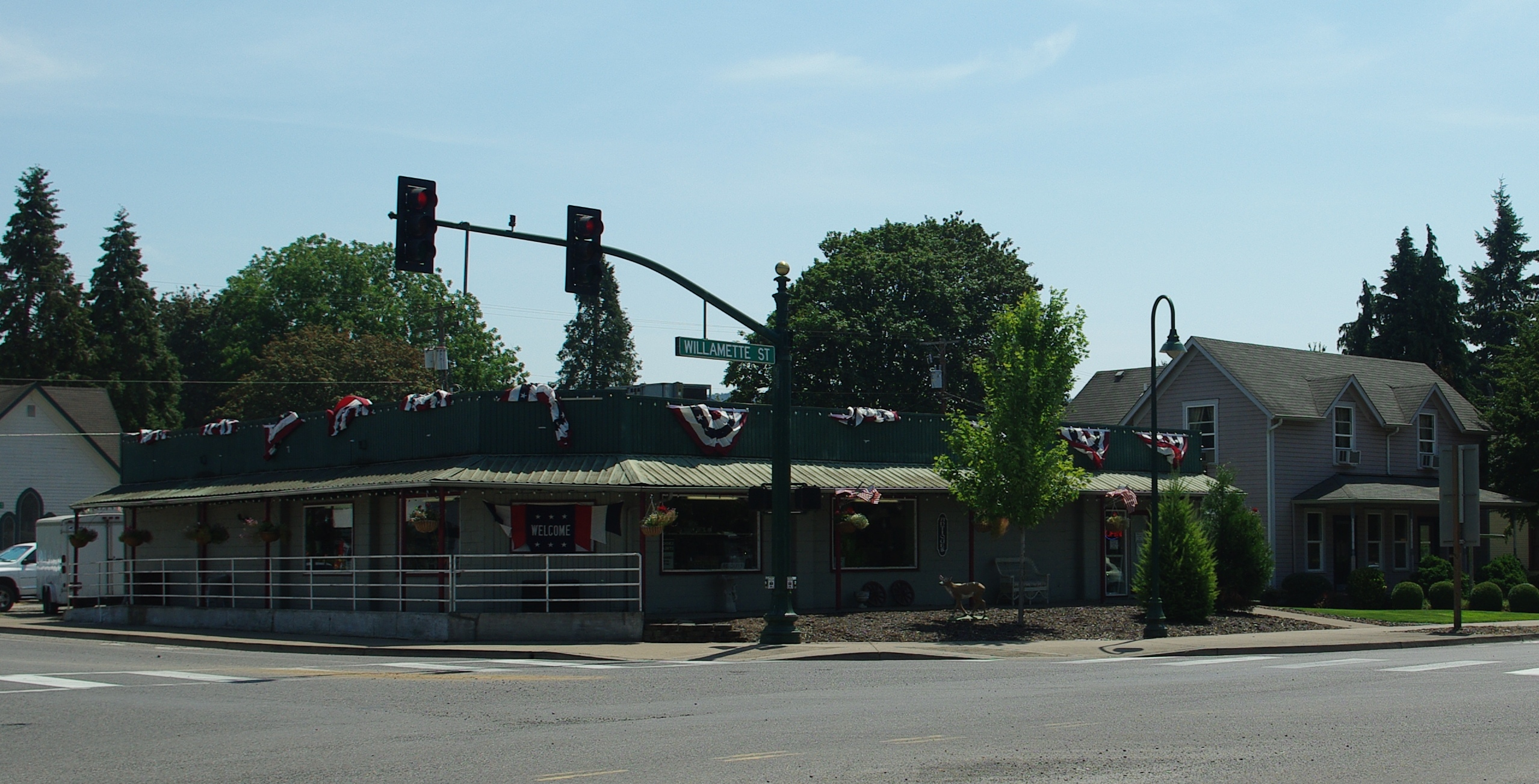
- Shop on Willamette Street

- Location in Oregon
- Coordinates: 44°08′22″N 123°03′32″W
- Country: United States
- State: Oregon
- County: Lane
- Incorporated: 1893

Area
  - Total: 1.03 sq mi (2.66 km^{2})
  - Land: 1.03 sq mi (2.66 km^{2})
  - Water: 0 sq mi (0.00 km^{2})
- Elevation: 400 ft (120 m)

Population (2020)
  - Total: 1,306
  - Density: 1,270.6/sq mi (490.57/km^{2})
- Time zone: UTC-8 (Pacific)
  - Summer (DST): UTC-7 (Pacific)
- ZIP code: 97408
- Area codes: 458 and 541
- FIPS code: 41-14400
- GNIS feature ID: 2409497
- Website: www.coburgoregon.gov

Coburg is a city (and a National Historic District) in Lane County, Oregon, United States, 8 miles (13 km) north of Eugene. The city's population as of the 2020 census was 1,306.

== History ==
The city was originally named Diamond after John Diamond, an early pioneer in the area, on whose land claim the city was located. The city's current name comes from a stallion that was named after the Coburg district of Bavaria, Germany, from whence the horse had been imported. The Coburg Historic District was placed on the National Register of Historic Places in 1986. The period of significance of the buildings in the district dates back to 1875. The citizens elected Carol Heinkel first woman mayor in 1988. The City installed a sewer system in 2011 to 2015, leading to a new period of growth in both residential and commercial investment.

== Economy ==
Downtown is a national historic center that includes 30 buildings on the register. Coburg is known for its attractive downtown, agricultural business connections, antique shops and annual antique fair. Coburg started to host the Pacific Northwest Marathon in 2018. (Source PNWM and City of Coburg) Several manufacturers are located along the I-5 corridor in Coburg.

=== Business ===
Coburg is headquarters for Marathon Coach Corporation, a manufacturer of luxury bus conversion motorcoaches. Marathon Coach has a manufacturing plant in Coburg, as well as plants in Grand Prairie, Texas, and San Antonio, Florida. Other businesses include APEL Extrusions.

=== Speed trap ===
Until the practice was discontinued in 2005, Coburg's city government had generated hundreds of thousands of dollars for its budget through speeding fines at a speed trap on Interstate 5 located outside of city limits. By 2003, the city was raising nearly half of its $1.7 million annual budget through traffic fines. The speed trap was temporarily ended when Floyd Prozanski, a state legislator from Eugene, sponsored bills to make the practice against the law, effective January 2004. Police Chief Hudson also lost his job, following the adoption of the new law. However, the city annexed a segment of I-5, which enabled the city to continue raising revenue this way.

== Geography ==
According to the United States Census Bureau, the city has a total area of 0.95 square miles (2.46 km^{2}), all of it land.

Coburg is situated near the Coburg Hills.

=== Climate ===
This region experiences warm (but not hot) and semi-dry summers with some rainy days, with no average monthly temperatures above 70.4 °F. According to the Köppen Climate Classification system, Coburg has a warm-summer Mediterranean climate, abbreviated "Csb" on climate maps.

There are cool winters during which intense rainfall occurs. It has warm, dry summers with moderate rainfall through the summer months.

Snow in Coburg is possible but rare in winter months due to the higher latitude.

Average December temperatures are a maximum of 45.6 °F (7.6 °C) and a minimum of 33.8 °F (1.0 °C). Average August temperatures are a maximum of 82.7 °F (28.2 °C) and a minimum of 51.6 °F (10.9 °C). The record high temperature was 108 °F (42 °C). The record low temperature was −12 °F (−24 °C).

Average annual precipitation is 48.3 inches (1,230 mm). There are on annual average 152 days with measurable precipitation.

Climate data for Coburg, Oregon
Month	Jan	Feb	Mar	Apr	May	Jun	Jul	Aug	Sep	Oct	Nov	Dec	Year
Mean daily maximum °F (°C)	47.3 (8.5)	51.5 (10.8)	56.5 (13.6)	61.0 (16.1)	67.4 (19.7)	73.4 (23.0)	81.9 (27.7)	82.7 (28.2)	77.1 (25.1)	64.7 (18.2)	52.4 (11.3)	45.6 (7.6)	63.5 (17.5)
Daily mean °F (°C)	40.7 (4.8)	43.2 (6.2)	46.9 (8.3)	50.4 (10.2)	53.6 (12.0)	60.8 (16.0)	66.9 (19.4)	67.2 (19.6)	62.5 (16.9)	53.4 (11.9)	48.3 (9.1)	39.7 (4.3)	52.8 (11.6)
Mean daily minimum °F (°C)	34.0 (1.1)	34.9 (1.6)	37.3 (2.9)	39.7 (4.3)	43.8 (6.6)	48.2 (9.0)	51.8 (11.0)	51.6 (10.9)	47.9 (8.8)	42.1 (5.6)	37.7 (3.2)	33.8 (1.0)	41.9 (5.5)
Average precipitation inches (mm)	6.9 (180)	5.4 (140)	5.1 (130)	3.6 (91)	3.9 (99)	1.6 (41)	0.6 (15)	0.6 (15)	1.3 (33)	3.4 (86)	7.8 (200)	8.1 (210)	48.3 (1,240)
Average snowfall inches (cm)	0.7 (1.8)	1.5 (3.8)	0.1 (0.25)	0 (0)	0 (0)	0 (0)	0 (0)	0 (0)	0 (0)	0 (0)	0.2 (0.51)	1.2 (3.0)	3.7 (9.36)
Average precipitation days	19	16	18	16	13	8	3	3	6	12	19	19	152
Average snowy days	0.6	0.8	0.2	0	0	0	0	0	0	0	0.1	0.7	2.4
Source: Bestplaces.net

== Demographics ==
Historical population
Census	Pop.	Note	%±
1910	613		—
1920	270		−56.0%
1930	263		−2.6%
1940	456		73.4%
1950	693		52.0%
1960	754		8.8%
1970	713		−5.4%
1980	699		−2.0%
1990	763		9.2%
2000	969		27.0%
2010	1,035		6.8%
2020	1,306		26.2%
U.S. Decennial Census

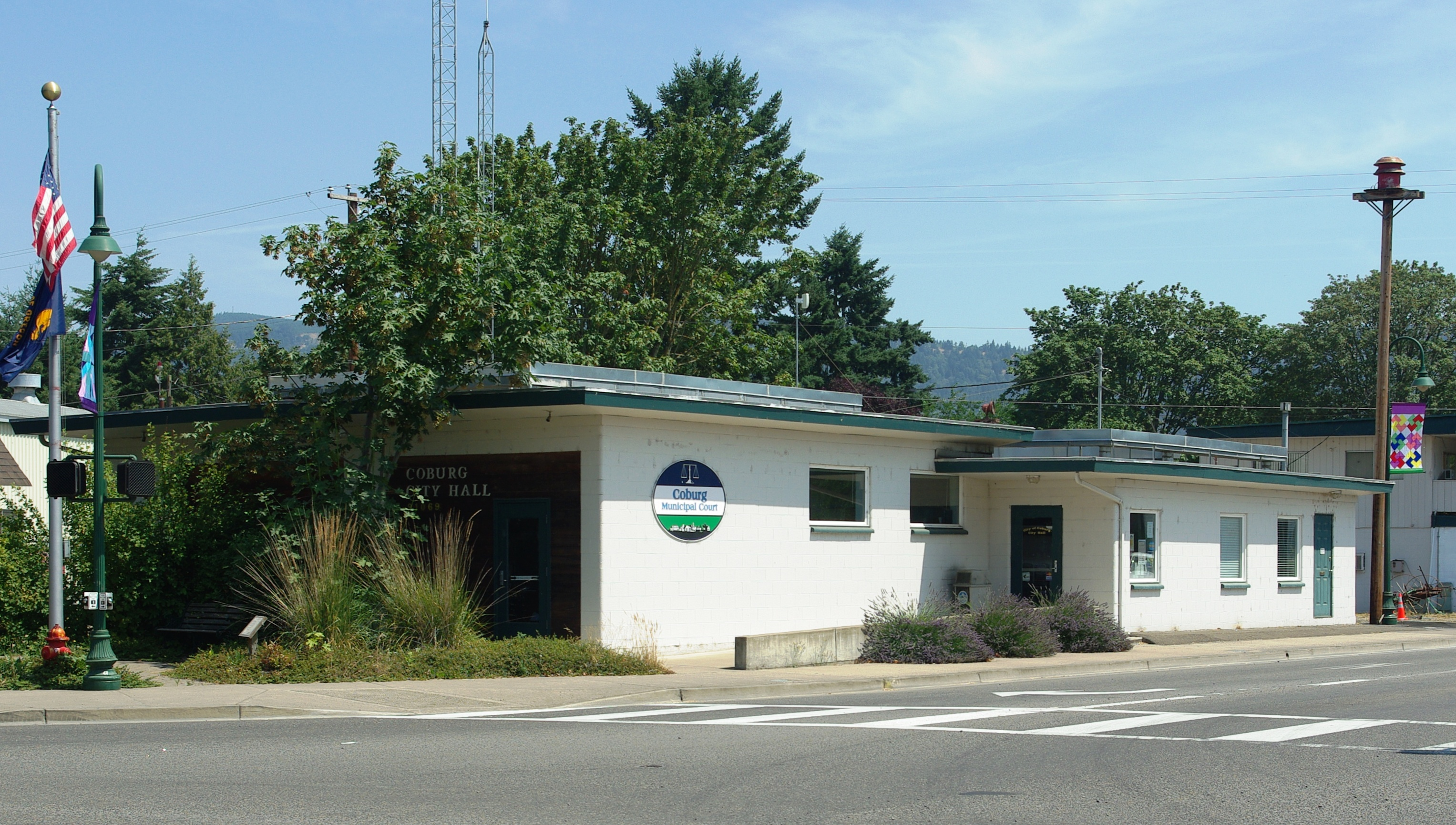
City hall and municipal court

=== 2020 census ===
As of the 2020 census, Coburg had a population of 1,306. The median age was 42.3 years, 22.4% of residents were under the age of 18, and 18.1% of residents were 65 years of age or older. For every 100 females there were 92.9 males, and for every 100 females age 18 and over there were 92.2 males age 18 and over.

100.0% of residents lived in urban areas, while 0% lived in rural areas.

There were 509 households in Coburg, of which 35.2% had children under the age of 18 living in them. Of all households, 57.8% were married-couple households, 13.2% were households with a male householder and no spouse or partner present, and 21.6% were households with a female householder and no spouse or partner present. About 21.0% of all households were made up of individuals and 8.8% had someone living alone who was 65 years of age or older.

There were 525 housing units, of which 3.0% were vacant. Among occupied housing units, 78.6% were owner-occupied and 21.4% were renter-occupied. The homeowner vacancy rate was 0.2% and the rental vacancy rate was 5.2%.

Racial composition as of the 2020 census
Race	Number	Percent
White	1,095	83.8%
Black or African American	9	0.7%
American Indian and Alaska Native	14	1.1%
Asian	13	1.0%
Native Hawaiian and Other Pacific Islander	3	0.2%
Some other race	31	2.4%
Two or more races	141	10.8%
Hispanic or Latino (of any race)	85	6.5%

=== 2010 census ===
As of the census of 2010, there were 1,035 people, 398 households, and 283 families living in the city. The population density was 1,089.5 inhabitants per square mile (420.7/km^{2}). There were 415 housing units at an average density of 436.8 per square mile (168.6/km^{2}). The racial makeup of the city was 90.4% White, 0.4% African American, 0.8% Native American, 1.4% Asian, 0.6% Pacific Islander, 2.7% from other races, and 3.7% from two or more races. Hispanic or Latino of any race were 7.4% of the population.

There were 398 households, of which 33.7% had children under the age of 18 living with them, 59.0% were married couples living together, 8.3% had a female householder with no husband present, 3.8% had a male householder with no wife present, and 28.9% were non-families. 20.6% of all households were made up of individuals, and 5.8% had someone living alone who was 65 years of age or older. The average household size was 2.60 and the average family size was 3.00.

The median age in the city was 41.6 years. 23.1% of residents were under the age of 18; 8% were between the ages of 18 and 24; 24% were from 25 to 44; 34.7% were from 45 to 64; and 10% were 65 years of age or older. The gender makeup of the city was 49.3% male and 50.7% female.

=== 2000 census ===
As of the census of 2000, there were 969 people, 367 households, and 256 families living in the city. The population density was 1,384.1 inhabitants per square mile (534.4/km^{2}). There were 387 housing units at an average density of 552.8 per square mile (213.4/km^{2}). The racial makeup of the city was 92.67% White, 1.96% Native American, 1.14% Asian, 0.31% Pacific Islander, 0.10% African American, 1.44% from other races, and 2.37% from two or more races. Hispanic or Latino of any race were 2.99% of the population. There were 367 households, out of which 36.5% had children under the age of 18 living with them, 59.1% were married couples living together, 8.7% had a female householder with no husband present, and 30.0% were non-families. 21.8% of all households were made up of individuals, and 6.3% had someone living alone who was 65 years of age or older. The average household size was 2.64 and the average family size was 3.07.

In the city, the population was 28.6% under the age of 18, 6.5% from 18 to 24, 28.8% from 25 to 44, 25.8% from 45 to 64, and 10.3% who were 65 years of age or older. The median age was 38 years. For every 100 females, there were 99.8 males. For every 100 females age 18 and over, there were 99.4 males. The median income for a household in the city was $47,500, and the median income for a family was $54,250. Males had a median income of $41,029 versus $26,071 for females. The per capita income for the city was $21,696. About 7.7% of families and 7.7% of the population were below the poverty line, including 4.5% of those under age 18 and 21.6% of those age 65 or over.

== Education ==
It is in the Eugene School District. Prior to joining the Eugene district in 1964, Coburg had its own district.

Lane County is in the Lane Community College district.

== Notable person ==
- Howie Fox, baseball player
- Carol Heinkel, first female mayor of Coburg, elected 1988
