= Coburg University of Applied Sciences =

- Hochschule Coburg
- Type: Public
- Established: 1814; 212 years ago 1971 (reestablished)
- Faculty: 100
- Students: 4,400
- Location: Coburg, Bayern, Germany; 50°15′53″N 10°57′08″E
- Campus: Urban, 3 locations
- Website: www.coburg-university.de

Coburg University of Applied Sciences (German: Hochschule Coburg, abbreviated Coburg University), re-established in 1971, is an engineering university in Coburg, Northern Bavaria, with more than 5,000 students (as of WS 2021/22)

It offers a broad scope of subjects. Young people from over 40 countries study at Coburg University. Coburg University has 75 international partner institutions.

== History ==
The origin of Coburg University date back to the Technical Training School, the Duke of Saxony in 1814 by the architect Friedrich Streib (1781 - 1852).

== Academic programs ==
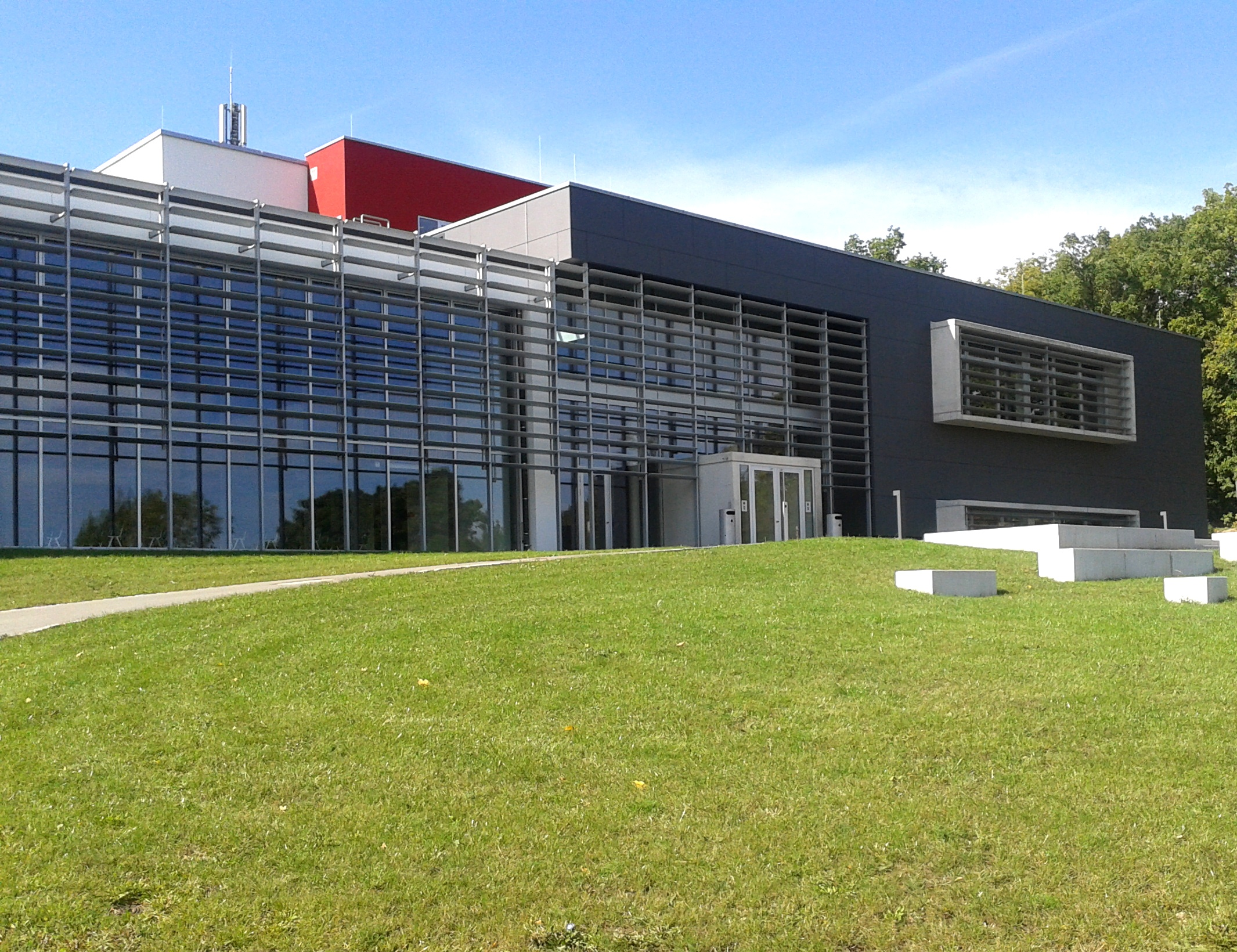
HS-Coburg (campus)

The university offers a practice-based study programme both in bachelor courses and courses with international qualifications in the faculties of engineering, business administration and social work. Excellent facilities, including computer pools and workshops, are available to the design-based diploma courses of interior design and integrated product design. Every year many people apply for a place to study at Coburg University of Applied Sciences.

The courses offered includes the four areas: Economics, Computer Science & Technology, Health and Social Work & Build, design and style.

They are distributed over two campuses. The design-based courses are conducted in the historic Hofbrauhaus. The other subjects have their rooms on campus Friedrich-Streib-Straße. The campus is located on a hill opposite to the Veste Coburg.

=== Research ===
All research is application-oriented. Within the six faculties, research projects of the companies, Non-Governmental Organizations (NGOs), as well as state-sponsored assignments are carried out. The students are involved through their seminar papers, final thesis and increasingly by doctorate studies. Within these studies, Coburg UoAS cooperates with national and international universities.

For legal reasons (Article 2 of the Bavarian Law on Higher Education), the research activities of the university are limited to applied research and development projects. The university has extensive contacts in industry throughout the region and carries out numerous technology and knowledge transfer projects.

=== Services for students ===
The "Akademische Auslandsamt” (international office) offers foreign first-year students special services, such as finding accommodation, information about aspects of life in Germany, and help with administrative tasks such as university registration and dealing with authorities.
