= First Merkel cabinet =

Government of Germany from 2005 to 2009

First Cabinet of Angela Merkel Cabinet Merkel I
- 20th Cabinet of the Federal Republic of Germany
- 22 November 2005 – 28 October 2009
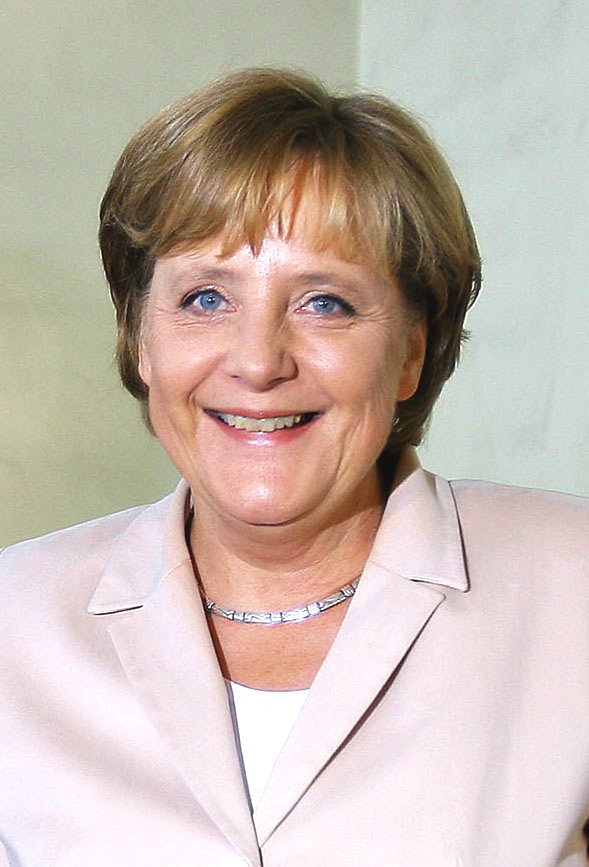
- Date formed: 22 November 2005
- Date dissolved: 27 October 2009 (3 years, 11 months and 5 days)

People and organisations
- President: Horst Köhler
- Chancellor: Angela Merkel
- Vice-Chancellor: Franz Müntefering (until 21 November 2007); Frank-Walter Steinmeier (from 21 November 2007)
- Member party: Christian Democratic Union; Social Democratic Party; Christian Social Union of Bavaria
- Status in legislature: Grand coalition
- Opposition party: Free Democratic Party; Party of Democratic Socialism; The Greens
- Opposition leader: Wolfgang Gerhardt (until 30 April 2006); Guido Westerwelle (from 30 April 2006)

History
- Election: 2005 federal election
- Legislature terms: 16th Bundestag
- Predecessor: Schröder II
- Successor: Merkel II

The First Merkel cabinet (German: Kabinett Merkel I) was the Government of the Federal Republic of Germany from 22 November 2005 to 27 October 2009 throughout the 16th legislative session of the Bundestag. Led by Christian Democrat Angela Merkel, the first female Chancellor in German history, the cabinet was supported by a grand coalition between the Christian Democratic Union (CDU), Christian Social Union of Bavaria (CSU) and the Social Democratic Party (SPD).

It was installed following the 2005 federal election and succeeded the second Schröder cabinet. It ceased to function after the formation of second Merkel cabinet, which was installed after the 2009 federal elections and sworn in on 28 October 2009.

== Composition ==
The federal cabinet consisted of the following ministers:

Cabinet members
Portfolio	Minister	Took office	Left office	Party
Chancellor	Angela Merkel	22 November 2005	Merkel II	CDU
Vice-Chancellor	Franz Müntefering	22 November 2005	21 November 2007	SPD
Vice-Chancellor	Frank-Walter Steinmeier	21 November 2007	27 October 2009	SPD
Minister of Foreign Affairs	Frank-Walter Steinmeier	22 November 2005	27 October 2009	SPD
Minister of Labour and Social Affairs	Franz Müntefering	22 November 2005	21 November 2007	SPD
Minister of Labour and Social Affairs	Olaf Scholz	21 November 2007	27 October 2009	SPD
Minister for the Environment, Nature Conservation, and Nuclear Safety	Sigmar Gabriel	22 November 2005	27 October 2009	SPD
Minister of Economics and Technology	Michael Glos	22 November 2005	10 February 2009	CSU
Minister of Economics and Technology	Karl-Theodor zu Guttenberg	10 February 2009	27 October 2009	CSU
Minister of Defence	Franz Josef Jung	22 November 2005	27 October 2009	CDU
Minister for Family Affairs, Senior Citizens, Women and Youth	Ursula von der Leyen	22 November 2005	Merkel II	CDU
Minister for Special Tasks and Head of the Chancellery	Thomas de Maizière	22 November 2005	27 October 2009	CDU
Minister of the Interior	Wolfgang Schäuble	22 November 2005	27 October 2009	CDU
Minister of Education and Research	Annette Schavan	22 November 2005	Merkel II	CDU
Minister of Health	Ulla Schmidt	12 January 2001	27 October 2009	SPD
Minister of Food, Agriculture and Consumer Protection	Horst Seehofer	22 November 2005	31 October 2008	CSU
Minister of Food, Agriculture and Consumer Protection	Ilse Aigner	31 October 2008	Merkel II	CSU
Minister of Finance	Peer Steinbrück	22 November 2005	27 October 2009	SPD
Minister of Transport, Building and Urban Affairs	Wolfgang Tiefensee	22 November 2005	27 October 2009	SPD
Minister for Economic Cooperation and Development	Heidemarie Wieczorek-Zeul	27 October 1998	28 October 2009	SPD
Minister of Justice	Brigitte Zypries	22 October 2002	27 October 2009	SPD

== Formation of the grand coalition ==
Neither the coalitions of the CDU/CSU and the Free Democratic Party (FDP) nor the ruling SPD and Alliance '90/The Greens had the vote of a majority of members of the Bundestag following the 2005 federal election, so the CDU/CSU and SPD decided to form the second grand coalition in the history of the federal republic. Both CDU/CSU and SPD achieved a similar percentage of votes at the election (35.2% and 34.2%, respectively), so they decided that each would receive eight cabinet seats (with six for the CDU and two for the CSU). On 13 October the SPD announced their future ministers and on 17 October the CDU/CSU announced theirs.

Edmund Stoiber of the CSU was to become the Federal Minister of Economics and Technology, but refused the post on 1 November after a conflict with Angela Merkel over the abilities of the minister to succeed him, and chose to continue his state-level role in Bavaria.

The coalition agreement (Koalitionsvertrag), titled Together for Germany. With courage and humanity, was signed and accepted by the congress of the CDU, CSU, and SPD on 12, 13, and 14 November. Angela Merkel was elected Chancellor of Germany on 22 November 2005 by 397 votes to 202. From that date the cabinet was officially in power.

== See also ==
- Cabinet of Germany
