= Michael Georg Link =

German politician

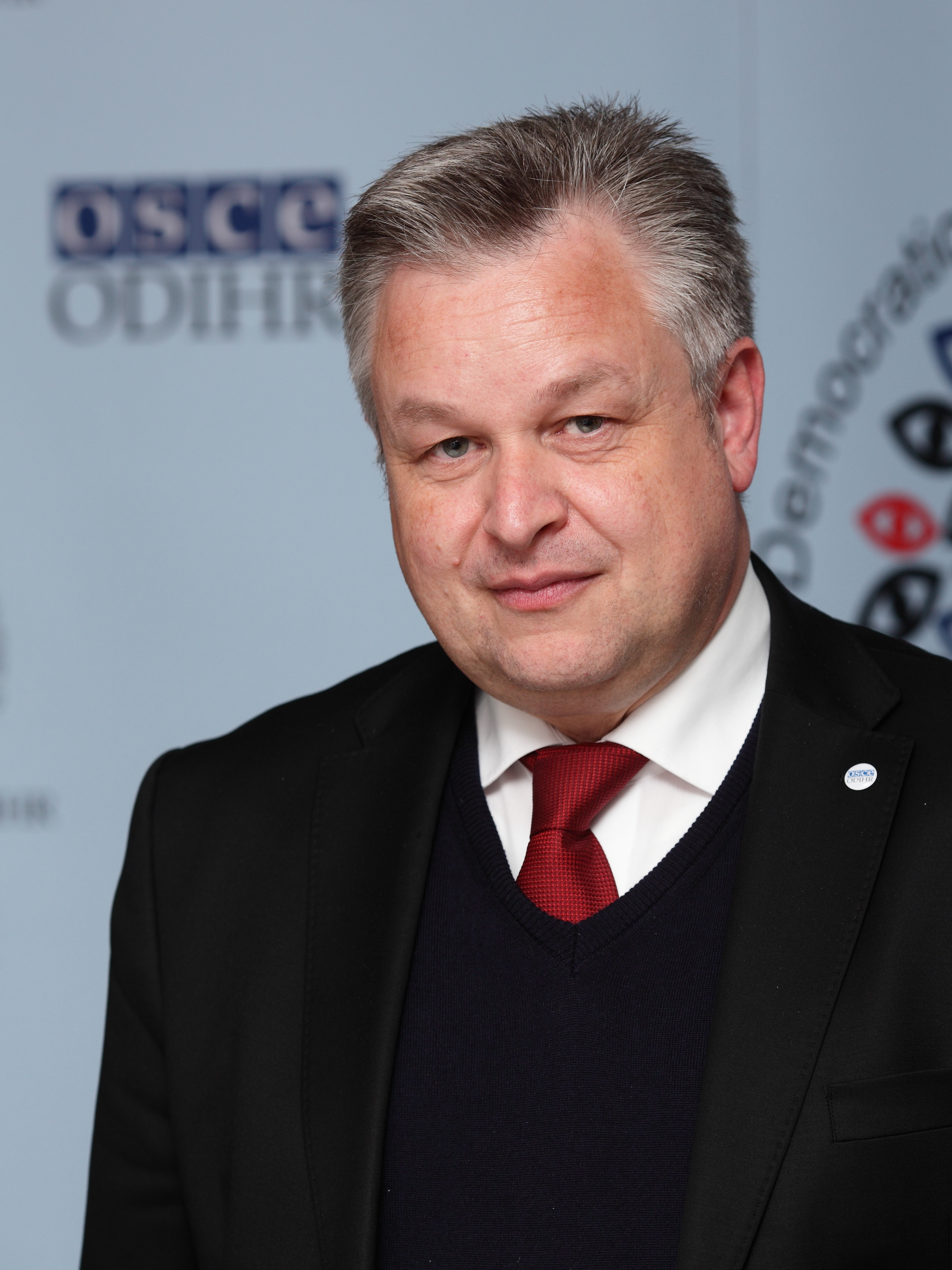
- Link in 2014

Minister of State in the Federal Foreign Office with Cornelia Pieper
- In office 2012–2013
- Preceded by: Werner Hoyer
- Succeeded by: Michael Roth

Member of the Bundestag
- In office 2005–2013
- In office 2017–2025

Personal details
- Born: 6 February 1963 (age 63) Heilbronn, Baden-Württemberg, West Germany (now Germany)
- Party: Free Democratic Party
- Education: University of Augsburg; University of Lausanne; Heidelberg University

Michael Georg Link (born 6 February 1963) is a German politician of the Free Democratic Party (FDP) who served a member of the Bundestag from 2005 to 2013 and again from 2017 to 2025.

In addition to his parliamentary mandate, Link served as First Deputy Foreign Minister (Minister of State for Europe) in the government of Chancellor Angela Merkel from 2012 to 2013 and as the Coordinator of Transatlantic Cooperation at the Federal Foreign Office in the coalition government of Chancellor Olaf Scholz from 2022 to 2024. He was the Director of the OSCE Office for Democratic Institutions and Human Rights (ODIHR) from July 2014 to June 2017.

== Early life and work ==
Link was born in Heilbronn, Germany. After graduating from secondary school at the Elly-Heuss-Knapp Gymnasium in Heilbronn, Link did his military service in the 364th Tank Battalion of the German Federal Armed Forces in Kuelsheim, after which he studied Russian, French, political science, public law and Eastern European history at the University of Augsburg, the University of Lausanne and Heidelberg University.

From 1995 to 1999, Link worked as a research assistant in the German Bundestag (study commission on German Unity), assistant to former German Foreign Minister Klaus Kinkel, and then as senior advisor to the FDP Parliamentary Group on International affairs.

== Political career ==
Link joined the Free Democratic Party (FDP) in 1986. From 1989 to 1995, he served as the Deputy National Chairman and Treasurer of the Young Liberals and as the representative of the Young Liberals in the Federal Executive of the FDP. In 2003, he became a member of the FDP Executive in the state of Baden-Württemberg, where he served as treasurer from 2006. Michael Link was elected to the Federal Executive of the FDP in 2010.

=== Member of Parliament, 2005-2013 ===
From 2005 to 2013, Link served as a member of the German Bundestag. In the negotiations to form a coalition government following the 2009 federal elections, he was part of the FDP delegation in the working group on foreign affairs, defense and development policy, led by Franz Josef Jung and Werner Hoyer.

In 2009, Link became spokesperson on European Union Budget and Finance for the FDP Parliamentary Group. From 2009 to 2012, he was the group's spokesperson on European Affairs and Chairman of the Parliamentary Group on International Affairs. From 2009 to 2012, Link was Deputy Chairman of the Bundestag's Committee on European Union Affairs. During this time, from 2006 to 2013, he was also a member of the Parliamentary Assembly of the OSCE.

=== First Deputy Foreign Minister, 2012-2013 ===
On 24 January 2012, Link succeeded Werner Hoyer as Minister of State for European Affairs and First Deputy Foreign Minister at the Federal Foreign Office. He was also Commissioner for Franco-German co-operation. In that capacity, he served as ex-officio chairman of the supervisory board of the Center for International Peace Operations (ZIF) and as member of the board of trustees of the German Foundation for Peace Research.

Link left the Bundestag as well as his office as Minister of State as a result of the change of government after the 2013 German federal election.

=== Director of ODIHR, 2014–2017 ===
In May 2014, Link was nominated to become Director of the Office for Democratic Institutions and Human Rights (ODIHR) of the Organization for Security and Co-operation in Europe (OSCE) by the Foreign Ministers of the 57 OSCE participating States. He assumed office on 1 July 2014.

In his capacity as director, Link notably attended a 2015 court hearing related to the case of Nadiya Savchenko, the Ukrainian Air Force pilot and Member of Parliament charged with complicity in the murder of two Russian journalists near Luhansk, at the Moscow City Court. He also served as chief election observer during the 2016 presidential election in the United States of America; the OSCE had sent its biggest team ever to the United States for the election amid charges from candidate Donald Trump that the poll could be "rigged" and concerns by civil rights activists that black voters could face undue obstacles.

Link was succeeded by Ingibjörg Sólrún Gísladóttir on 19 July 2017.

=== Member of Parliament, 2017–2025 ===
Link was re-elected to the German Bundestag in the 2017 elections. He subsequently served on the Committee on European Affairs and on the Budget Committee's Sub-Committee on European Affairs. On the Budget Committee, he was his parliamentary group's rapporteur on the budgets of the Federal Foreign Office (2018–2025) and the Federal Ministry for Economic Cooperation and Development (2018–2021). He also served as deputy chairman of the German-French Parliamentary Friendship Group and of the German-Russian Parliamentary Friendship Group.

In addition to his committee assignments, Link served as substitute member of the German delegation to the Parliamentary Assembly of the Council of Europe (PACE). At the Assembly, he was a member of the Committee on Rules of Procedure, Immunities and Institutional Affairs. He was also elected deputy chairperson of the Alliance of Liberals and Democrats for Europe group under the leadership of chair Rik Daems in 2018.

During his time in office, Link also led the short-term OSCE observer missions for the 2018 presidential elections in Russia and the 2023 presidential election in Turkey.

In the negotiations to form a so-called traffic light coalition of the Social Democratic Party (SPD), the Green Party and the FDP following the 2021 federal elections, Link was part of his party's delegation in the working group on foreign policy, defence, development cooperation and human rights, co-chaired by Heiko Maas, Omid Nouripour and Alexander Graf Lambsdorff.

== Other activities ==
- 1014 – space for ideas, Member of the Board of Directors (since 2022)
- Center for International Peace Operations (ZIF), Member of the International Advisory Board
- Friedrich Naumann Foundation for Freedom, Member of the Board of Trustees
- Franco-German Institute (DFI), Member of the Board
- Foundation for Polish-German Cooperation, Member of the Board of Trustees
- German-French Institute (DFI), Member of the Board
- Humanity in Action Germany, Member of the Advisory Board
- Reinhold Maier Foundation, Member of the Board
- German Council on Foreign Relations (DGAP), Member
- German Association for Eastern European Studies (DGO), Member
- Southeast Europe Association, Member
- German Atlantic Association, Member
- Walther Rathenau Institute, Member of the Board (–2022)
