= Sabine Leutheusser-Schnarrenberger =

German politician

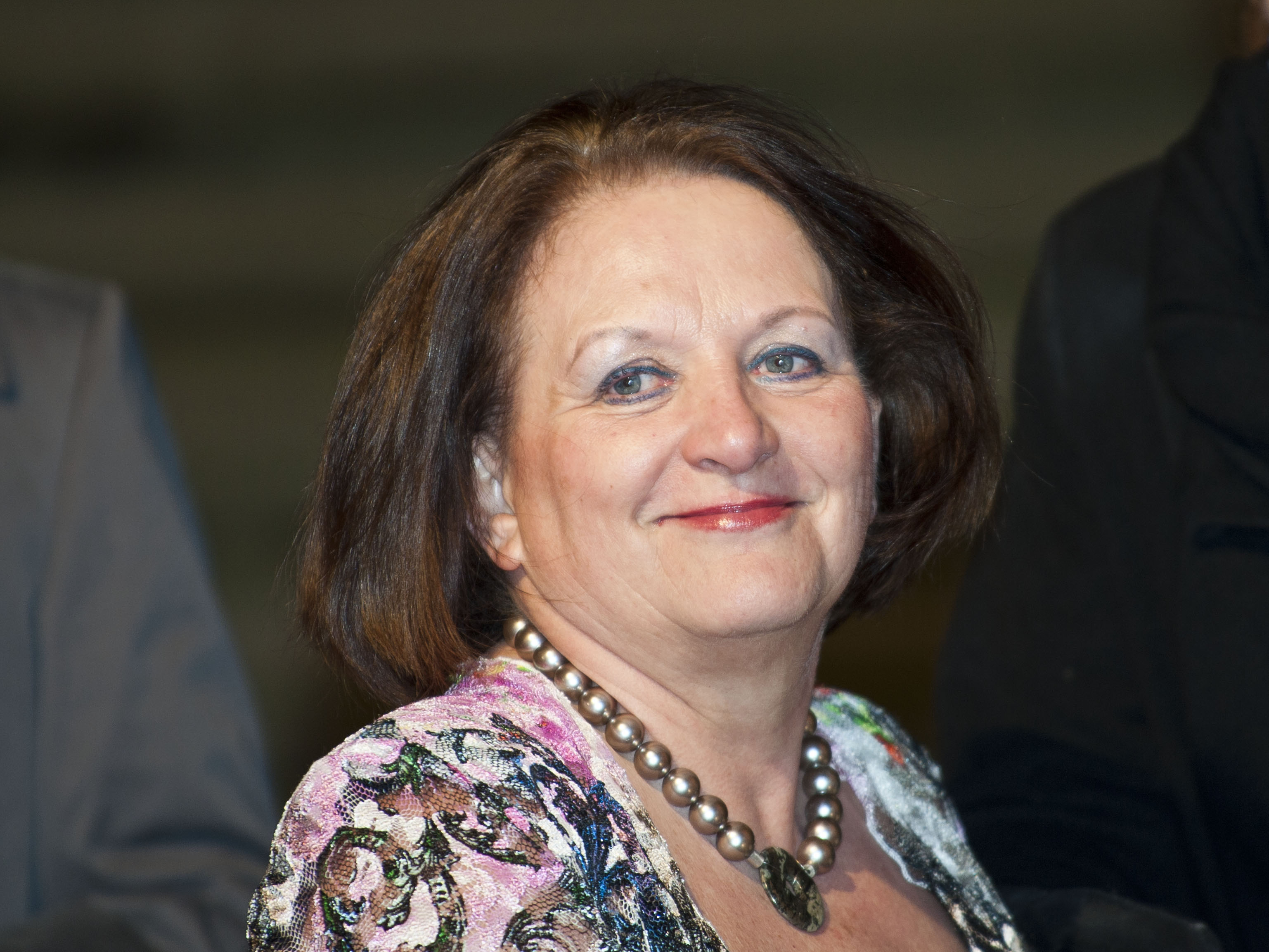

Federal Minister of Justice
- In office 28 October 2009 – 17 December 2013
- Chancellor: Angela Merkel
- Preceded by: Brigitte Zypries
- Succeeded by: Heiko Maas
- In office 18 May 1992 – 17 January 1996
- Chancellor: Helmut Kohl
- Preceded by: Klaus Kinkel
- Succeeded by: Edzard Schmidt-Jortzig

Member of the Bundestag for Bavaria
- In office 2 December 1990 – 22 September 2013
- Constituency: Free Democratic Party List

Personal details
- Born: Sabine Leutheusser; 26 July 1951 (age 75) Minden, West Germany
- Party: Free Democratic Party
- Education: University of Göttingen; Bielefeld University
- Website: Official website

Sabine Leutheusser-Schnarrenberger [zaˈbiːnə ˈlɔʏthɔʏsɐ ˈʃnaʀənˌbɛɐ̯ɡɐ] (née Leutheusser; born 26 July 1951) is a German politician of the liberal Free Democratic Party and a prominent advocate of human rights in Germany and Europe. Within the FDP, she is a leading figure of the social-liberal wing. She served as Federal Minister of Justice of Germany from 1992 to 1996 in the cabinet of Helmut Kohl and again in the second Merkel cabinet from 2009 to 2013. In 2013, the new German government announced Leutheusser-Schnarrenberger's candidacy for the office of the Secretary General of the Council of Europe.

== Early life and work ==
Sabine Leutheusser was born in Minden, North Rhine-Westphalia. After graduating from gymnasium in Minden in 1970, Leutheusser-Schnarrenberger started studying law in Göttingen and Bielefeld.

In 1975, she passed the first state exam in Hamm, in 1978 the second state exam in Düsseldorf. From 1979 to 1990, she worked at the Deutsches Patent- und Markenamt in Munich, eventually as managing director. In addition to her mandate as a member of the German parliament (Bundestag), she worked as a lawyer in Munich since 1997.

== Political career ==
In 1978 Leutheusser-Schnarrenberger became a member of the Free Democratic Party (FDP). Since 1991 she has been a member of federal board of the FDP.

=== Member of the Bundestag and Federal Minister of Justice, 1992–96 ===
From 12 December 1990 Leutheusser-Schnarrenberger was a member of the German Bundestag. On 18 May 1992 she was sworn in as Federal Minister of Justice of Germany, following the nomination of incumbent Klaus Kinkel as Foreign Minister in the government of Chancellor Helmut Kohl. She had previously won an internal vote against Burkhard Hirsch and became the first woman to hold this office.

Upon taking office, Leutheusser-Schnarrenberger pushed for police receiving new training and equipment to counter extremism and tougher court sentences for those found guilty of extremist violence.

In 1994, she publicly condemned a regional court for adulating radical rightist leader Günter Deckert after handing him a light sentence for Holocaust denial, calling the judges’ decision "a slap in the face to all victims of the Holocaust". When Denmark agreed to extradite Gary Lauck, an American neo-Nazi charged with being the main supplier of illegal fascist propaganda to German authorities in 1995, Leutheusser-Schnarrenberger called the decision a "great victory against right-wing extremism."

In 1995 there was a broad public discussion in Germany about the invulnerability of the private domain by means of acoustic observation (Großer Lauschangriff, literally "big eavesdropping attack"). In this argument Leutheusser-Schnarrenberger strongly objected to expanding the state's right to interfere in citizens' private domain. After the members of the FDP decided in a poll to support the conservative lead of the CDU in this matter, she resigned from her office on 1 January 1996.

From May 1997 Leutheusser-Schnarrenberger was a member of the Steering Committee of the FDP ("Präsidium"). On 2 December 2000 she also became FDP chairwoman for the Federal State of Bavaria. She served twice as Deputy Chairwoman of the FDP parliamentary group, from 2 February 2001 to 2 October 2002 and from 27 September 2005 until 28 October 2009.

=== Member of the Bundestag and the Parliamentary Assembly of the Council of Europe, 1996–2009 ===
Following her time in government, Leutheusser-Schnarrenberger sharpened her profile as deputy parliamentary leader of the FDP and high-profile civil rights campaigner. From 1999 to 2000 she was a member of an international inquiry commission of the United Nations to examine allegations of human rights violations in East Timor and submitted its report to secretary general Kofi Annan.

During the 16th Legislative Term of the Bundestag between 2005 and 2009, Leutheusser-Schnarrenberger was spokeswoman on legal policy for the FDP parliamentary group, chairwoman of the FDP in the parliamentary committee on legal affairs and alternate member in the parliamentary Committee on Human Rights and Humanitarian Aid. From 2009, she also served on the parliamentary body in charge of selecting the judges of the Highest Courts of Justice, namely the Federal Court of Justice (BGH), the Federal Administrative Court (BVerwG), the Federal Fiscal Court (BFH), the Federal Labour Court (BAG), and the Federal Social Court (BSG).

Leutheusser-Schnarrenberger was also active in the Council of Europe. From 2003 to 2009 she was member of the German delegation at the Parliamentary Assembly of the Council of Europe. As member of the Council of Europe's Committee on Legal Affairs and Human Rights, she conducted an investigative trip to Russia and authored a critical report on the country's judicial system. In 2008, she presented a report to the Parliamentary Assembly on the investigation of the Gongadze case and other crimes of the Kuchma era in Ukraine. Titled Allegations of Politically Motivated Abuses of the Criminal Justice System in Council of Europe Member States, her 2009 report examined alleged abuses in Britain, Germany, France, and Russia. Much of the document focused on Russia, detailing several recent cases that "give rise to concerns that the fight against 'legal nihilism' launched by President Medvedev is still far from won." During an April 2009 visit to Ukraine, Leutheusser-Schnarrenberger, co-rapporteur of the Parliamentary Assembly's Committee on Legal Affairs and Human Rights, cautiously encouraged reform of the parliamentary system in Ukraine. She also expressed regret that those who ordered Georgiy Gongadze's murder had still not been brought to justice.

In 2008, Leutheusser-Schnarrenberger – in her role as chairwoman of the FDP in Bavaria – successfully ran the party's election campaign in the Bavarian state elections that year, where the FDP reentered the state parliament after 14 years of absence.

=== Federal Minister of Justice, 2009–13 ===
In the negotiations to form a coalition government of the FDP and the Christian Democrats (CDU together with the Bavarian CSU) following the 2009 federal elections, Leutheusser-Schnarrenberger led the FDP delegation in the working group on internal and legal affairs; her counterpart of the CDU/CSU was Wolfgang Schäuble.

Between 2009 and 2013, Leutheusser-Schnarrenberger served as Federal Minister of Justice again, this time in the second Merkel cabinet. Alongside four men, she was the only female FDP member in Merkel's cabinet and the only FDP member of the cabinet to have previously held government office. During her time in office, she would often push the FDP's pro-civil liberties agenda, but frequently encountered resistance from a conservatives-controlled interior ministry led by Thomas de Maizière and later Hans-Peter Friedrich.

In 2010, former president of the Federal Constitutional Court Jutta Limbach in an interview proposed that Leutheusser-Schnarrenberger be made a judge at the court, praising her "intellectual honesty"; instead, Andreas Voßkuhle was nominated by the SPD.

In 2011, Leutheusser-Schnarrenberger became one of the first prominent Free Democratic politicians to suggest a change in the party's top leadership. She recommended that the incumbent Guido Westerwelle be replaced by Christian Lindner, then the party's general secretary.

Ahead of the 2013 elections, Leutheusser-Schnarrenberger was elected to lead her party's campaign in the state of Bavaria.

=== Candidacy for Secretary General of the Council of Europe, 2013–14 ===
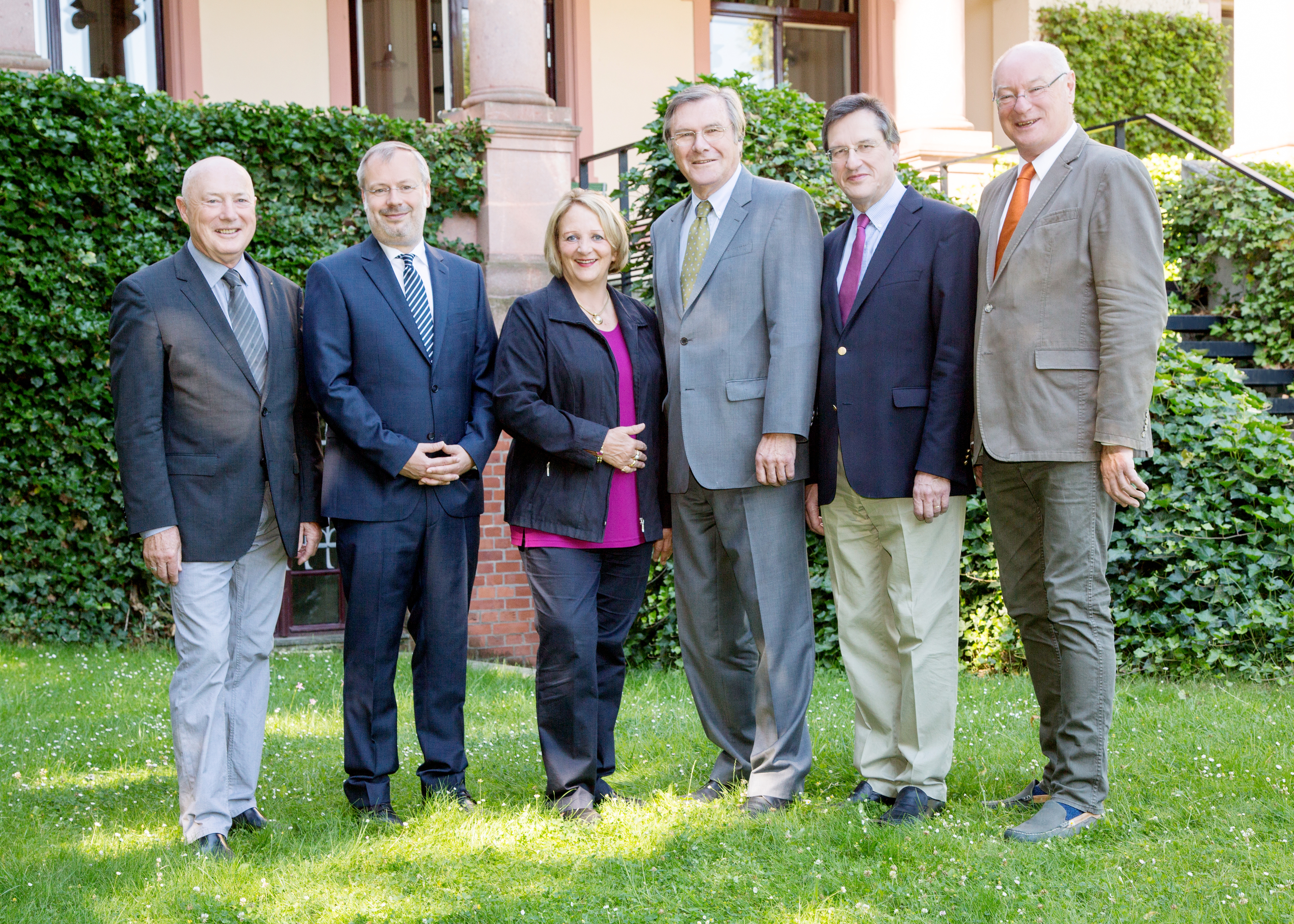
Leutheusser-Schnarrenberger with Wolf-Dieter Zumpfort, Steffen Saebisch, Wolfgang Gerhardt, Karl-Heinz Paqué and Manfred Richter (2017)

In 2013, the new German government announced Leutheusser-Schnarrenberger's candidacy for the office of the Secretary General of the Council of Europe. From December 2013, Leutheusser-Schnarrenberger visited more than 20 member states.

In the first round of the election on 24 June 2014, Leutheusser-Schnarrenberger lost against incumbent Thorbjørn Jagland who obtained an absolute majority.

=== Later career ===
Leutheusser-Schnarrenberger continues to be a frequent commentator on human rights and data protection in German media. In 2014, she was appointed to an advisory council established by Google on implementing the right to be forgotten.

From 2014 to 2026, Leutheusser-Schnarrenberger was a member of the executive board of the Friedrich Naumann Foundation. In 2018, she was also appointed to the honorary office of State Commissioner for the Fight against Anti-Semitism in the government of Minister-President of North Rhine-Westphalia Armin Laschet.

== Political views ==
=== On crime and prosecutions ===
Soon after taking office in 2009, Leutheusser-Schnarrenberger demanded that US courts could not seek the death penalty for terrorists Zacarias Moussaoui and Ramzi Binalshibh in return for receiving evidence provided by German investigators. In order to verify that the US government keeps its word, she teamed up with the Foreign Ministry to send German observers to monitor the trial in New York.

Under legislation introduced by Leutheusser-Schnarrenberger following a wave of revelations about Catholic priest abusing minors in 2011, Germans who were sexually abused as children today have as long as 30 years after they turn 21 to bring accusations in court; the previous statute of limitations on civil abuse cases was three years. The minister also urged the church to compensate victims and participate in a "round table" with their representatives.

=== On data protection ===
In 2010, talking about issues like privacy and copyright, she complained about Google's instinct for "pressing ahead" and its "megalomania". That same year, she asked Apple Inc. to tell state data protection officials about the kind of data the company was gathering on individual iPhone users in Germany. In a case Leutheusser herself brought to the Federal Constitutional Court of Germany, the judges eventually rejected a core piece of security legislation that requires data on telephone calls and e-mail traffic to be stored for up to six months for possible use by law enforcement and intelligence agencies. As part of the draft of a law governing workplace privacy, she proposed placing restrictions on employers who want to use Facebook profiles when recruiting. She also expressed her support for legislation that would punish officials who purchase illegally obtained data of German tax evaders in Switzerland.

In response to the 2013 mass surveillance scandal, Leutheusser-Schnarrenberger, in a guest editorial for the Web site Spiegel Online, called the revelations about the U.S. surveillance "deeply disconcerting" and possibly "dangerous." A week before President Barack Obama's visit to Berlin in June 2013, she rejected Obama's earlier statement that "you can’t have 100 percent security and also then have 100 percent privacy and zero inconvenience." In her commentary she wrote: "I don’t share this assessment. A society is less free the more intensively its citizens are watched, controlled and observed. Security is not an end in itself in a democratic society, but rather serves the security of freedom."

Shortly after, Leutheusser-Schnarrenberger sent two letters to the British justice secretary, Chris Grayling, and the home secretary, Theresa May, stressing the widespread concern the disclosures about the GCHQ Tempora programme triggered in Germany and demanding to know the extent to which German citizens have been targeted. At the same time, Leutheusser-Schnarrenberger demanded that the German intelligence service BND provide a full explanation after it admitted to passing on massive amounts of so-called "metadata" to the NSA. When the United States approached E.U. justice ministers in October 2013 about signing an agreement to extradite former NSA contractor Edward Snowden to the U.S. should he set foot on their soil, Leutheusser-Schnarrenberger refused to sign because she was not certain that Snowden had broken any laws and because he might make a good witness in a German parliamentary inquiry.

=== On LGBT rights ===
Leutheusser-Schnarrenberger long sought to make LGBT rights in Germany a key plank in the Free Democrats' platform. In 2012, she had her office prepare a "draft of a law to revise the rights of domestic partners," which would have put gays and lesbians on equal footing with married couples in all conceivable spheres of life, including adoption. When the Federal Constitutional Court of Germany ruled in 2013 that excluding same-sex couples from a tax benefit available for married partners is unconstitutional and said the government must retroactively change the 12-year-old legislation, she pressed for legislative action. Again, after the court decided that gays and lesbians should be allowed to adopt children already adopted by their partners, the minister argued that "[t]he decision to put civil unions and marriage on level footing needs a big push"; however, her party's efforts failed due to opposing views of her conservative coalition partner.

=== On rule of law in Russia ===
After a Russian court found deceased lawyer Sergei Magnitsky guilty of tax evasion in 2013, Leutheusser-Schnarrenberger condemned the posthumous verdict, saying on Twitter: "The conviction of the dead Magnitsky is further evidence of the Sovietization of Russia." A presidential human rights commission headed by former Russian president Dmitry Medvedev had found in 2011 that the charges against the lawyer had been fabricated.

With regard to the Russian LGBT propaganda law introduced in 2013, she commented in Welt am Sonntag that "Russia is taking another big step towards becoming a flawless dictatorship in ostracizing homosexuals." Unlike German chancellor Angela Merkel and foreign minister Guido Westerwelle at the time, Leutheusser-Schnarrenberger later suggested that the newly enacted law, which discriminates against gays and lesbians, could be grounds for boycotting the 2014 Winter Olympics.

On 3 March 2015, Leutheusser-Schnarrenberger attended the funeral of Russian politician Boris Nemtsov, who had been shot and killed on 27 February 2015.

Leutheusser-Schnarrenberger called chancellor Angela Merkel to show commitment to convince Russian president Vladimir Putin to release jailed Ukrainian filmmaker Oleg Sentsov.

=== On the fight against terrorism ===
After then-Interior Minister Wolfgang Schäuble confirmed in late 2005 that, under the previous government led by Gerhard Schröder, German agents had interviewed Mohammed Haydar Zammar, Leutheusser-Schnarrenberger condemned these methods: "If you're not allowed to torture, then you're not allowed to profit from information that may have been obtained through kidnapping and torture."

During a domestic debate on anti-terrorism legislation, Leutheusser-Schnarrenberger in 2010 warned that passenger profiling in German airports where passengers are categorized as high or low risk based on, among other things, their ethnic background, might fall foul of German and European law.

=== On arms exports ===
In the Federal Security Council (Bundessicherheitsrat), Leutheusser-Schnarrenberger was one of the most vocal critics of German arms exports to Saudi Arabia. In 2011, she initially opposed Merkel when the Council discussed Saudi Arabia's request for up to 270 Leopard 2 tanks, but then she deferred to the cabinet's decision. Leutheusser-Schnarrenberger did not attend a Council meeting in December 2012 when the ministers voted on the purchase of a few hundred "Boxer" armed transport vehicles.

=== On European integration ===
During the 2012–13 Cypriot financial crisis, Leutheusser-Schnarrenberger broke new ground by calling directly on European Union leaders to do more to defend Germany's role in helping the weaker Eurozone members. She noted that although all Eurozone member countries were involved in deciding on aid packages when a country applied for help, Germany always ended up as the target of anger.

=== On Vergangenheitsbewältigung of German Nazi past ===
During the period of Reunification in the 1990s', Leutheusser Schnarrenberger, as Minister of Justice, refused to return eight buildings in East Germany belonging to six Austrian Jewish citizens. Allgemeine Judische Wochenzeitung; 10 September 1992; "Expropriation through the back door; German Government adds to its coffers / Loopholes in German bureaucracy make Injustice permanent." ("Enteignung durch die Hintertur. Der Bund bereichert sich / winkelzuge deutscher burokratie schreiben unrecht fest").

In the 2012 Munich artworks discovery, Leutheusser-Schnarrenberger refused to retroactively extend the statute of limitations in order to prosecute Cornelius Gurlitt, the 80-year-old who hoarded artworks for half a century, urging him instead to acknowledge he has "moral as well as legal obligations."

== Other activities ==
=== Corporate boards ===
- Deutsche Telekom, Member of the Data Privacy Advisory Board (2009)

=== Non-profits ===
- Deutsche Postcode Lotterie, Vice Chair of the advisory board (since 2020)
- Deutsches Museum, Member of the Board of Trustees
- Transparency Germany, Member of the Board (since 2016)
- Max Planck Institute for Foreign and International Criminal Law, Member of the Board of Trustees
- Theodor Heuss Foundation, Member of the Executive Committee
- Gegen Vergessen – Für Demokratie, Member
- Weißer Ring e.V. (Support for victims and crime prevention), Member
- Sebastian Cobler Foundation for Civil Rights, Member of the Board of Trustees
- Pro Justitia Foundation (Promoting Research in the field of Law), Member of the Advisory Board
- Humanist Union Bavaria, Member

== Recognition ==
- 1995 – Hamm-Brücher Medal
- 1996 – Paul Klinger Prize by the Vereinte Dienstleistungsgewerkschaft
- 1997 – Mona Lisa Woman of the Year
- 2002 – 1st Class of the Order of Merit of the Federal Republic of Germany
- 2002 – Bavarian Order of Merit
- 2010 – "Kompassnadel" of the Gay Network in North Rhine-Westphalia
- 2011 – Silver Bavarian Constitutional Medal
- 2013 – Max Alsberg Prize
- 2014 – Arnold Freymuth Prize
- 2016 – Max Friedlaender Prize

== Personal life ==
Leutheusser-Schnarrenberger lives in Feldafing. She is widowed, after her husband, Ernst Schnarrenberger, died of cancer in 2006. Her father, Dr. Horst Leutheusser, was also a lawyer, and deputy mayor of Minden as member of the CDU. Her uncle, Wolfgang Stammberger, was one of her predecessors as minister of justice (from 1961 to 1962).

== Publications (selection) ==
- "Gegenkurs. Plädoyer für eine selbstbewusste Politik der Freiheit" (96).
- Zwischen Einbürgerung und politischer Partizipation 'ausländischer Mitbürger'. Welchen Spielraum gewährt der demokratische Rechtsstaat in Deutschland? In: Büttner, Christian / Meyer, Berthold (eds.): Integration durch Partizipation. 'Ausländische Mitbürger' in demokratischen Gesellschaften. Campus Publisher 2001, pp. 31–43
- Vorratsdatenspeicherung – Ein vorprogrammierter Verfassungskonflikt. In: Zeitschrift für Rechtspolitik, 2007, p. 9 ff.
- Auf dem Weg in den autoritären Staat. In: Blätter für deutsche und internationale Politik, Edition 1/2008, pp. 62–70

Political offices
| Preceded by Klaus Kinkel | Minister of Justice; 1992–1996 | Succeeded by Edzard Schmidt-Jortzig |
| Preceded by Brigitte Zypries | Minister of Justice; 2009–2013 | Succeeded by Heiko Maas |
