= Cornelia Pieper =

German politician

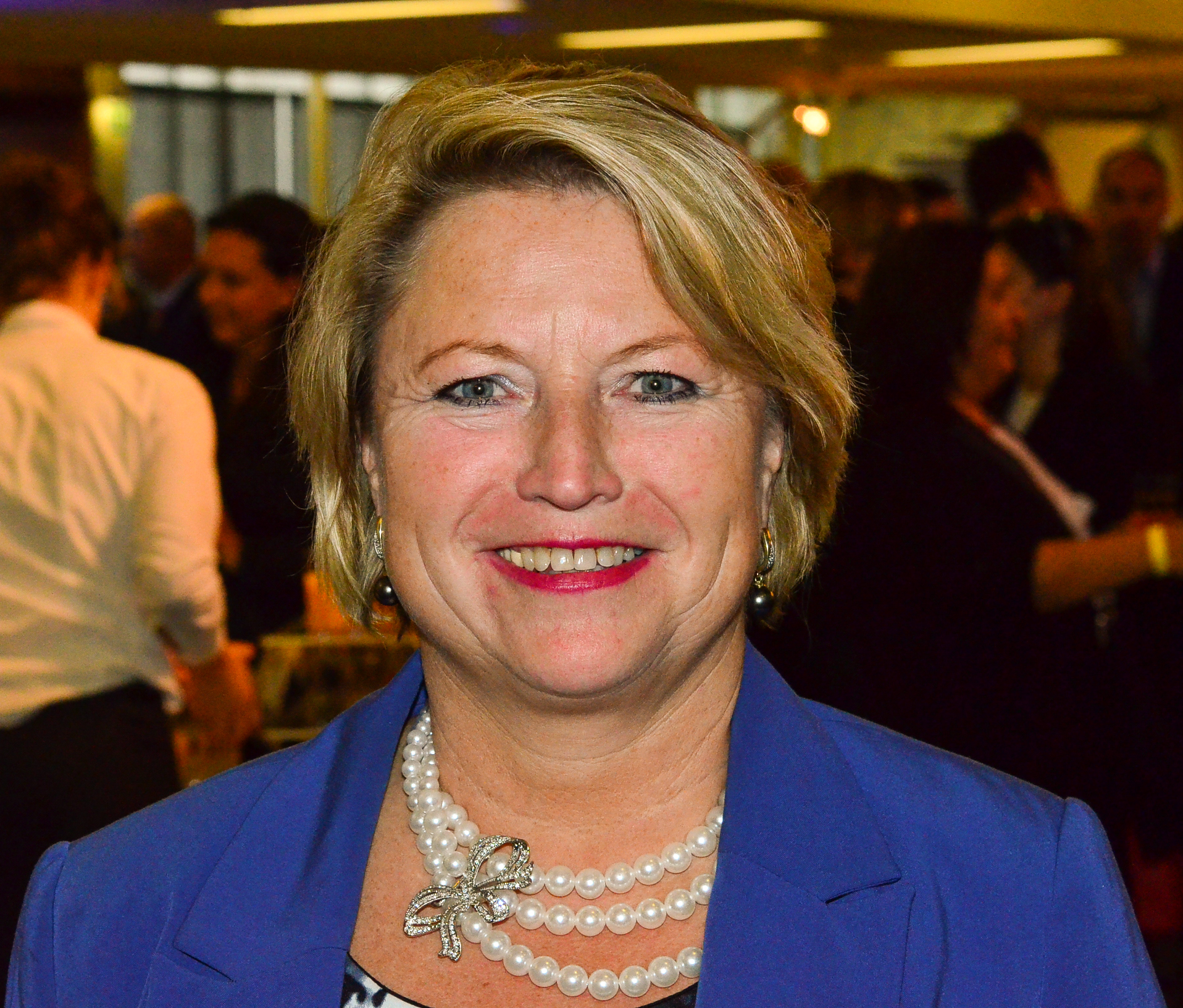

Minister of State at the Federal Foreign Office with Werner Hoyer (2009-2012) with Michael Georg Link (2012-2013)
- In office 2009–2013

Member of the Bundestag
- In office 1998–2013

Personal details
- Born: Cornelia Richter; 4 February 1959 (age 67) Halle, East Germany
- Party: Free Democratic Party
- Education: University of Leipzig
- Profession: translator
- Website: cornelia-pieper.de

Cornelia Pieper (née Richter; born 4 February 1959) is a German politician of the liberal Free Democratic Party (FDP). She currently serves as German consul general in Gdańsk, Poland.

Pieper previously served as Minister of State at the Foreign Office under Foreign Minister Guido Westerwelle in the second cabinet of Chancellor Angela Merkel (from 28 October 2009). She was secretary general of her party from 2001 to 2005. From 2005 until 2011, she served as deputy chairwoman of the FDP, also under Westerwelle’s leadership.

== Background ==
Pieper was born in Halle, East Germany. After her Abitur she studied Polish and Russian in Leipzig and Warsaw. She finished in 1982 with a Diplom. She worked as an interpreter in the tourism and cultural sector until 1985, after which she was employed in the IT department at a television production company in Halle. Since 1996 she has worked as a freelance translator. She was also the co-founder, first chairwoman and is now a member of the board of trustees of the Erhard Hübener Foundation in Saxony-Anhalt.

== Political career ==
From 1987 to 1990, Pieper was engaged at the Liberal Democratic Party of Germany. In 1990 she joined the FDP and became a member of the party's executive board in the State of Saxony-Anhalt. From 1990 to 1994, she was a member of the Landtag in Saxony-Anhalt.

From 1995 to 2011, Pieper served as chairwoman of the FDP in Saxony-Anhalt. She was also a member of the party's federal executive board. From 1997 to 2001, she was deputy chairwoman of the federal FDP. A close political ally of Guido Westerwelle, she supported him from 2001 to 2005 as the party's secretary general. In May 2005, Pieper once again was elected deputy chairwoman of the FDP.

In the 1998, Pieper was for the first time elected into the Bundestag. There she was deputy chairwoman of the FDP's parliamentary group from 1998 to 2001.

Pieper was elected top candidate of the FDP for the 2002 Saxony-Anhalt state election. The party gained 13.3% of the votes. That was a satisfactory result, since the FDP hadn't even gained the necessary 5% at the previous State elections in 1998. Therefore, Pieper was one more time elected into the Landtag.

Pieper served as a member of the Bundestag again from 2002 to 2013. Between October 1997 and June 2001, she was the deputy chairwoman of the FDP parliamentary group and was group’s spokesperson on research policy. She was the chairwoman of the Committee for Education, Research and Technology Assessment from February to October 2005 and then as deputy chairwoman from November 2005 to October 2009. Between 2005 and 2009, she also served as Deputy Chairwoman of the German-Polish Parliamentary Friendship Group.

Following the 2009 federal elections, Pieper was part of the FDP team in the negotiations with the CDU/CSU on a coalition agreement. She was part of the FDP delegation in the working group on education and research policy, led by Annette Schavan and Andreas Pinkwart.

From 2009 to 2013, Pieper served as the Minister of State at the Federal Foreign Office, responsible for cultural relations and education policy. During her time in office, she publicly criticised Russia’s human rights policy, particularly after the arrest of members of the protest group Pussy Riot. In a 2012 interview with Deutsche Welle, she commented: "There is no freedom of speech, freedom of opinion or freedom of the arts and culture in Russia. It makes me queasy to look at the developments currently happening in Russia."

Since 2014, Pieper has been serving as German consul general in Gdańsk, Poland.

== Other activities ==
- German-Polish Science Foundation (DPWS), Chair of the Board (since 2022)
- German Poland Institute, Member of the Board of Trustees
- Martin Luther University of Halle-Wittenberg, Member of the Board of Trustees
- St Barbara Foundation, Member of the Board of Trustees
