= Werner Hoyer =

German politician (born 1951)

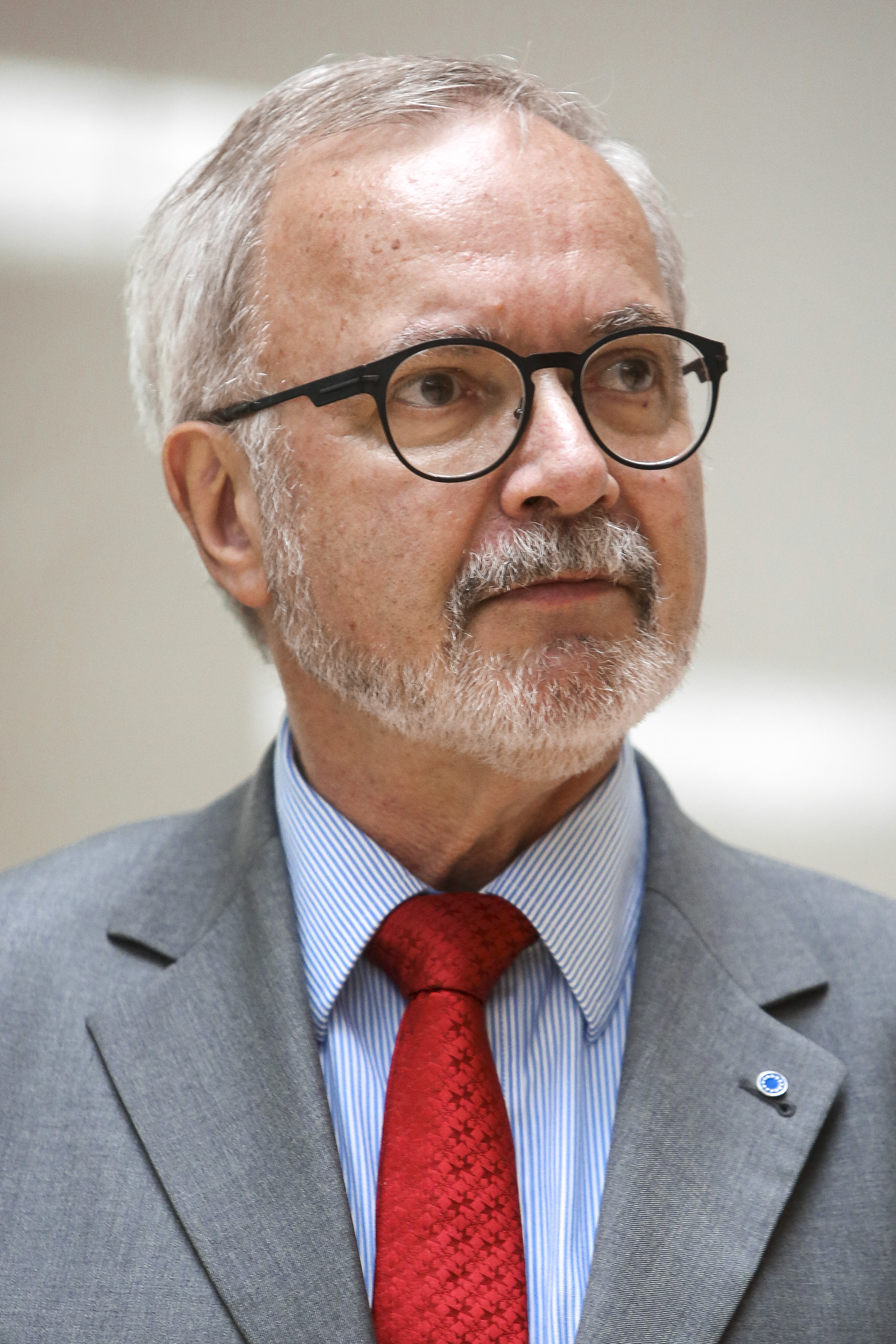
- Hoyer in 2017

President of the European Investment Bank
- In office 1 January 2012 – 1 January 2024
- Preceded by: Philippe Maystadt
- Succeeded by: Nadia Calviño

Minister of State for Europe
- In office 28 October 2009 – 31 December 2011
- Chancellor: Angela Merkel
- Preceded by: Günter Gloser
- Succeeded by: Michael Georg Link
- In office 17 November 1994 – 27 October 1998
- Chancellor: Helmut Kohl
- Preceded by: Helmut Schäfer
- Succeeded by: Ludger Vollmer

Member of the Bundestag for North Rhine-Westphalia
- In office 25 January 1987 – 1 January 2012
- Constituency: Free Democratic List

Personal details
- Born: 17 November 1951 (age 74) Wuppertal, West Germany (current-day Germany)
- Party: Free Democratic Party
- Education: University of Cologne

Werner Hoyer (born 17 November 1951) is a German economist and politician of the Free Democratic Party (FDP) who served as President of the European Investment Bank (EIB) between 2012 and 2023.

== Education and early career ==
Hoyer graduated as an economist at the University of Cologne in 1974, and worked as a scientific assistant there until 1984. He earned from the same university a PhD degree in economics (i.e. German doctorate Dr. rer. pol.) in 1977, with a dissertation called Vermögenseffekte des Geldes – Theoretische Ansätze zur Rolle des Geldes als Vermögensobjekt im Wirtschaftsprozess (Wealth Effects of Money – Theoretical Approaches to the Role of Money as a Capital Property in the Economic Process). From 1985 to 1987, he worked with the Carl Duisberg Society in Cologne. He taught international economics at the University of Cologne until 1994. Hoyer is a member of the Union of European Federalists (UEF).

== Political career ==
In 1972, Hoyer became a member of the FDP, and was a board member of the Young Liberals from 1983 to 1986. He chaired the local party board in Cologne from 1984 to 1992, and became a member of the FDP board in North Rhine-Westphalia in 1984 and the federal FDP board in 1994. Under the leadership of Klaus Kinkel, he was Secretary General of his party from 1993 to 1994. From 1997 to 2000, he was Vice President and from 2000 to 2005, President, of the European Liberal Democrat and Reform Party.

=== Member of the German Bundestag, 1987–2012 ===
Hoyer first became a member of the Bundestag in the 1987 elections, and served as chief whip from 1989 to 1993 and his party's spokesman for security policy from 1990 to 1994. From 2002 to 2009, he was deputy chair of the FDP parliamentary group in the Bundestag under the leadership of successive chairmen Wolfgang Gerhardt (2002-2006) and Guido Westerwelle (2006-2009). Between 2005 and 2009, he also served as Deputy Chairman of the German-American Parliamentary Friendship Group.

Minister of State at the Federal Foreign Office, 1994–98

From 1994 to 1998, Hoyer was Minister of State at the Foreign Office in the Fifth Kohl Cabinet under Foreign Minister Klaus Kinkel. In this capacity, he was the German representative in a high-level working group chaired by Spanish foreign minister Carlos Westendorp and set up to prepare the negotiations on treaty change which led to the Treaties of Amsterdam and subsequently, Nice. In 1996, he was the German negotiator during an intergovernmental conference in Turin that was aimed at improvements in the European Union's decision-making processes, including the establishment of a High Representative of the Union for Foreign Affairs and Security Policy. He also repeatedly reiterated German determination to enter a single currency – the Euro – by 1999.

Minister of State at the Federal Foreign Office, 2009–12

From 28 October 2009 Hoyer was Minister of State at the Foreign Office in the Second Cabinet Merkel under Foreign Minister Guido Westerwelle. During that time, he was Germany's official in charge of German-French relations. He resigned in 2012.

In August 2011, Hoyer issued a tough statement criticizing plans by Denmark to build new control posts between the two countries, insisting that this unilateral decision to increase customs procedures on the border violated European law.

=== President of the European Investment Bank, 2012–2023 ===
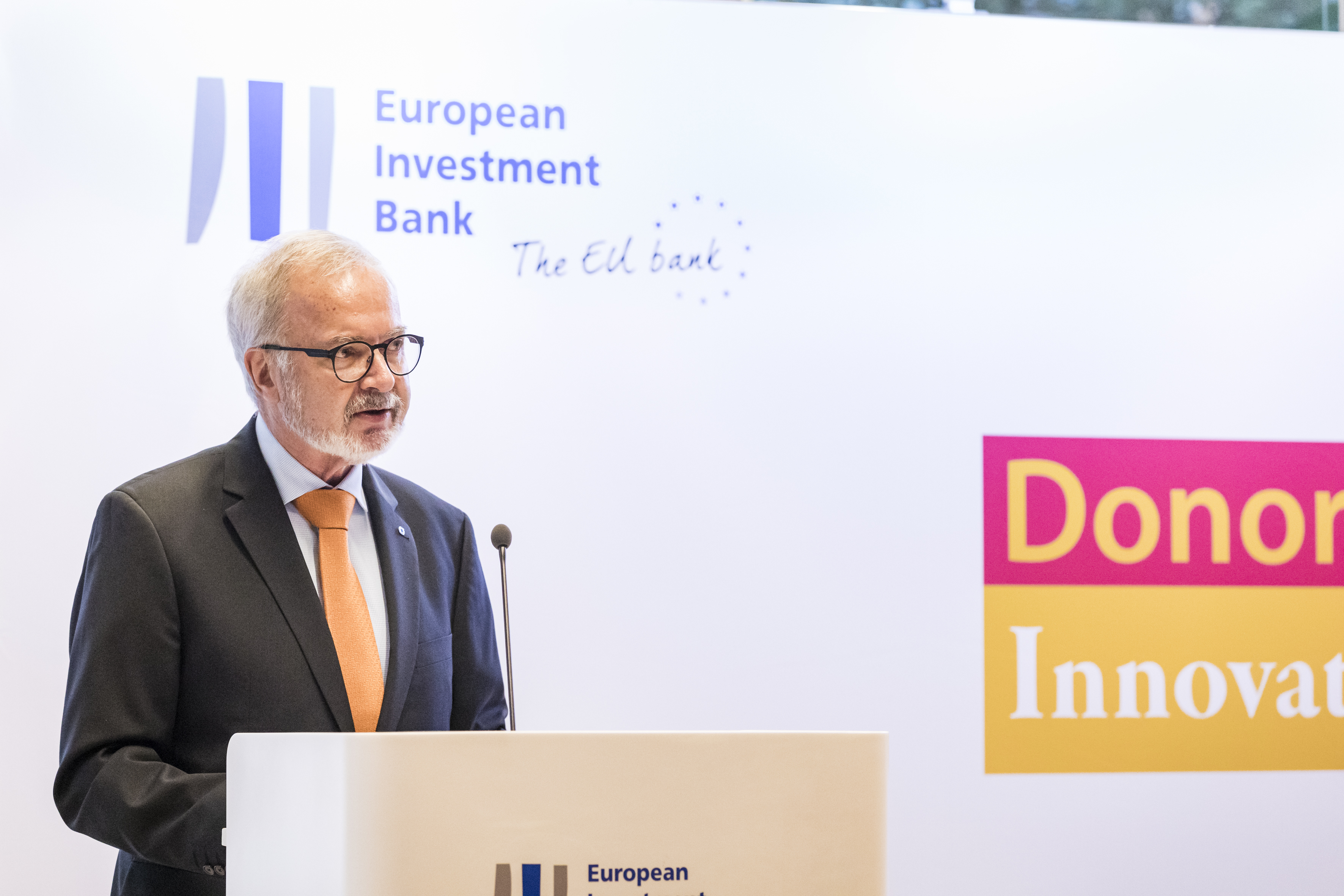
European Investment Bank president Hoyer at a Donor's conference in 2019

On the basis of a nomination by the German government, Hoyer was appointed as President and Member of the Management Committee of the European Investment Bank in 2012, succeeding Philippe Maystadt. His competitors for the post were Maystadt himself and Magdalena Álvarez, at the time one of the EIB's eight vice-presidents. In 2017, Hoyer was re-appointed for a second six-year term.

In 2012, Hoyer called for a new Marshall Plan – a reference to the US-financed programme that revived European economies after World War II – to be launched to reanimate the Greek economy, involving both private and public investment. He said the EIB had the resources to invest in Greek infrastructure and support Greek banks to revive lending to businesses.

Following his party’s strong performance in the 2017 German elections, Hoyer was cited as a possible candidate to succeed Wolfgang Schäuble and take over as Federal Minister of Finance.

During his last annual results press conference in 2023, Mr. Hoyer unveiled the new EIB logo.

On 24 June 2024 the European Public Prosecutor’s Office issued a statement that it had obtained the lifting of immunity for two former EIB employees. Various media outlets reported that Werner Hoyer was under investigation for corruption, abuse of influence, and the misappropriation of EU funds. Hoyer has described the allegations as absurd and unfounded.

== Other activities ==
- Berlin office of the American Jewish Committee (AJC), Member of the Advisory Board
- Charlemagne Prize Foundation, Member of the Board
- European Leadership Network (ELN), Member
- European Movement International, Member of the Honorary Council
- Friedrich August von Hayek Foundation, Member of the Board of Trustees
- German-Algerian Society, President
- German Council on Foreign Relations (DGAP), Member of the Steering Committee
- Institute for European Politics, President of the Board of Trustees
- Ludwig Erhard Foundation, Member

== Personal life ==
Hoyer is married and has two children.

Civic offices
Preceded by Philippe Maystadt	President of the European Investment Bank; 2012–2024	Succeeded by Nadia Calviño
