= Edzard Schmidt-Jortzig =

German jurist (born 1941)

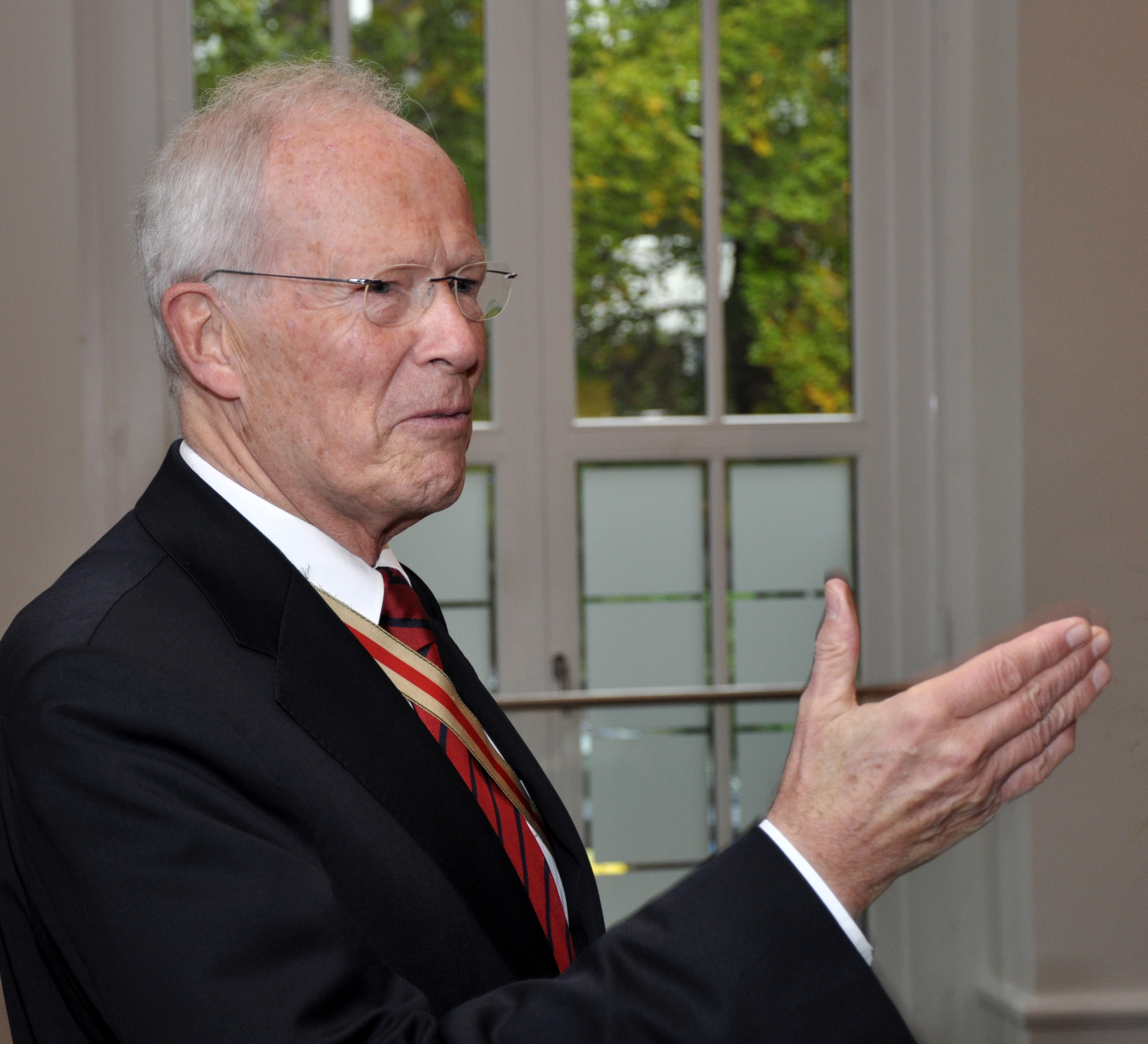
- Schmidt-Jortzig in 2015

Federal Minister of Justice
- In office 17 January 1996 – 26 October 1998
- Chancellor: Helmut Kohl
- Preceded by: Sabine Leutheusser-Schnarrenberger
- Succeeded by: Herta Däubler-Gmelin

Personal details
- Born: 8 October 1941 (age 84) Berlin, Germany
- Party: Free Democratic
- Spouse: Marion von Arnim (m. 1968)
- Education: University of Hannover
- Profession: Jurist
- Website: www.uni-kiel.de/oeffrecht/schmidt-jortzig/

Edzard Schmidt-Jortzig (born 8 October 1941) is a German jurist. He currently holds the chair for public law at the University of Kiel. A member of the Free Democratic Party, he served as Federal Minister of Justice in the Fifth Kohl cabinet between 1996 and 1998.

Born in Berlin, Schmidt-Jortzig was raised in Lüneburg, Lower Saxony. He studied law and received his first Staatsexamen in 1966, and the second in 1969. In 1984, he became a professor of public law at the University of Kiel and joined the Free Democratic Party.

In the 1994 German federal election, he earned a seat in the Bundestag, and in 1996, he succeeded Sabine Leutheusser-Schnarrenberger as Federal Minister of Justice of Germany.
