= The Ministry and the Past =

The Ministry and the Past: German Diplomacy in the Third Reich and the Federal Republic (German: Das Amt und die Vergangenheit: Deutsche Diplomaten im Dritten Reich und in der Bundesrepublik) is an 880-page report released by the German Foreign Office and published by Karl Blessing Verlag on October 28, 2010. The report establishes that the Foreign Office was deeply involved in the Holocaust.

The report was commissioned by former Foreign Minister Joschka Fischer in 2005 and prepared for German Foreign Minister Guido Westerwelle. The report's findings were to be incorporated into training for future German diplomats.

The report has been published commercially and went on sale before it had been delivered to Westerwelle. It was available for €34.95 at some exchanges. As of March 2012, over 75,000 copies of the report had been sold, an unusually high number for a history book that occupies such a specialized niche. Some as such TIME magazine's Berlin correspondent have questioned why it took the German government 65 years to release this report and suggested that there was a widespread coverup of the diplomats' role in the "Final Solution."
