= Michael Mronz =

German sports and events manager (born 1967)

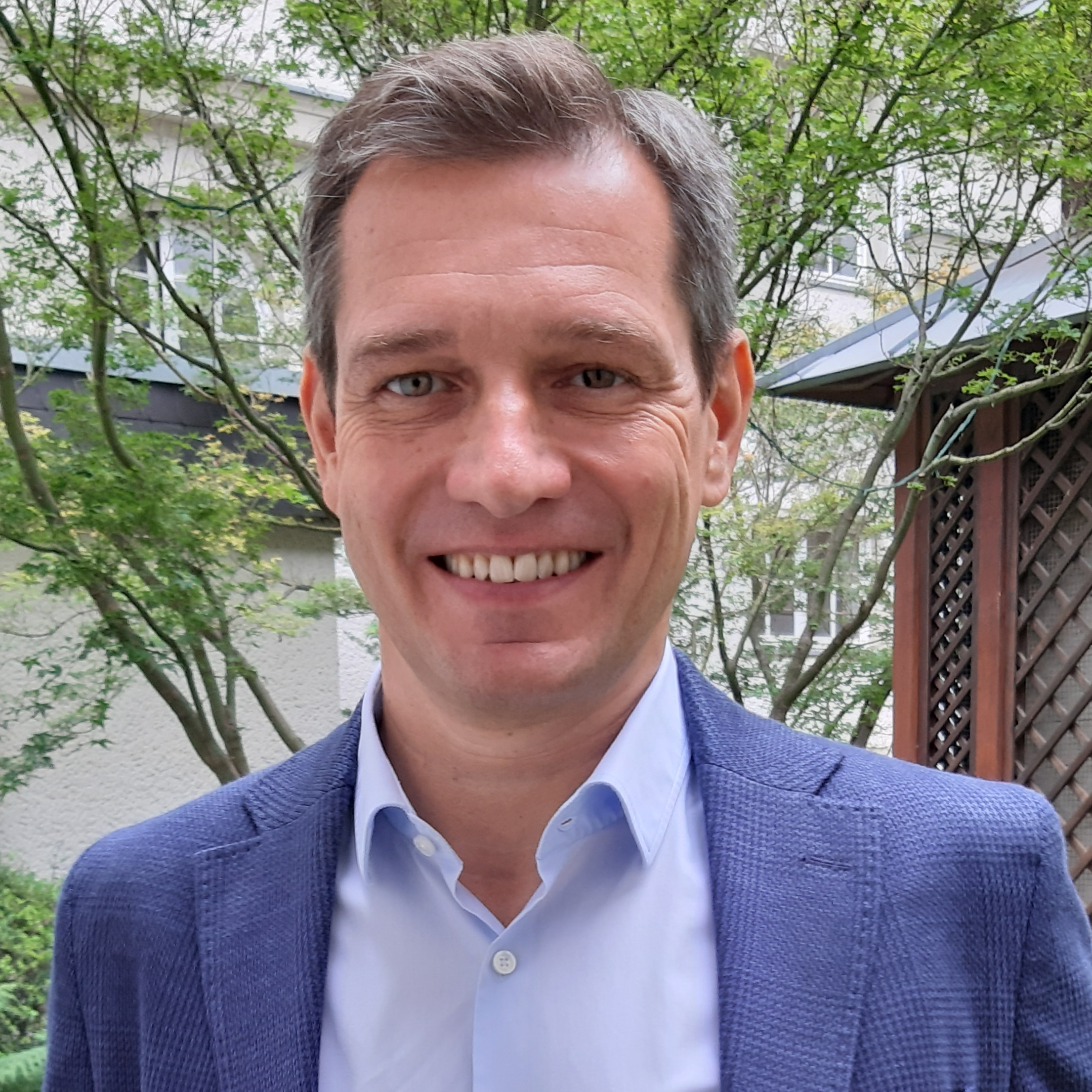
- Mronz in 2019
- Born: 1 March 1967 (age 59); Cologne, North Rhine-Westphalia, West Germany
- Education: University of Cologne
- Occupation: Sports manager
- Partner(s): Guido Westerwelle (2010–2016; his death)
- Relatives: Alexander Mronz (brother)

Michael Mronz (born 1 March 1967) is a German sports and events manager.

== Early life and education ==
Mronz was born in Cologne in 1967 and grew up in Cologne-Junkersdorf, the youngest son of gallerist Ute Mronz and architect Johannes Mronz. He was very interested in sport at an early age. His brother is former tennis professional Alexander Mronz. Mronz began to organise tennis tournaments while studying economics in Göttingen. He completed his degree in economics at the University of Cologne in the winter of 1999 and obtained the qualification as a business graduate.

== Career ==
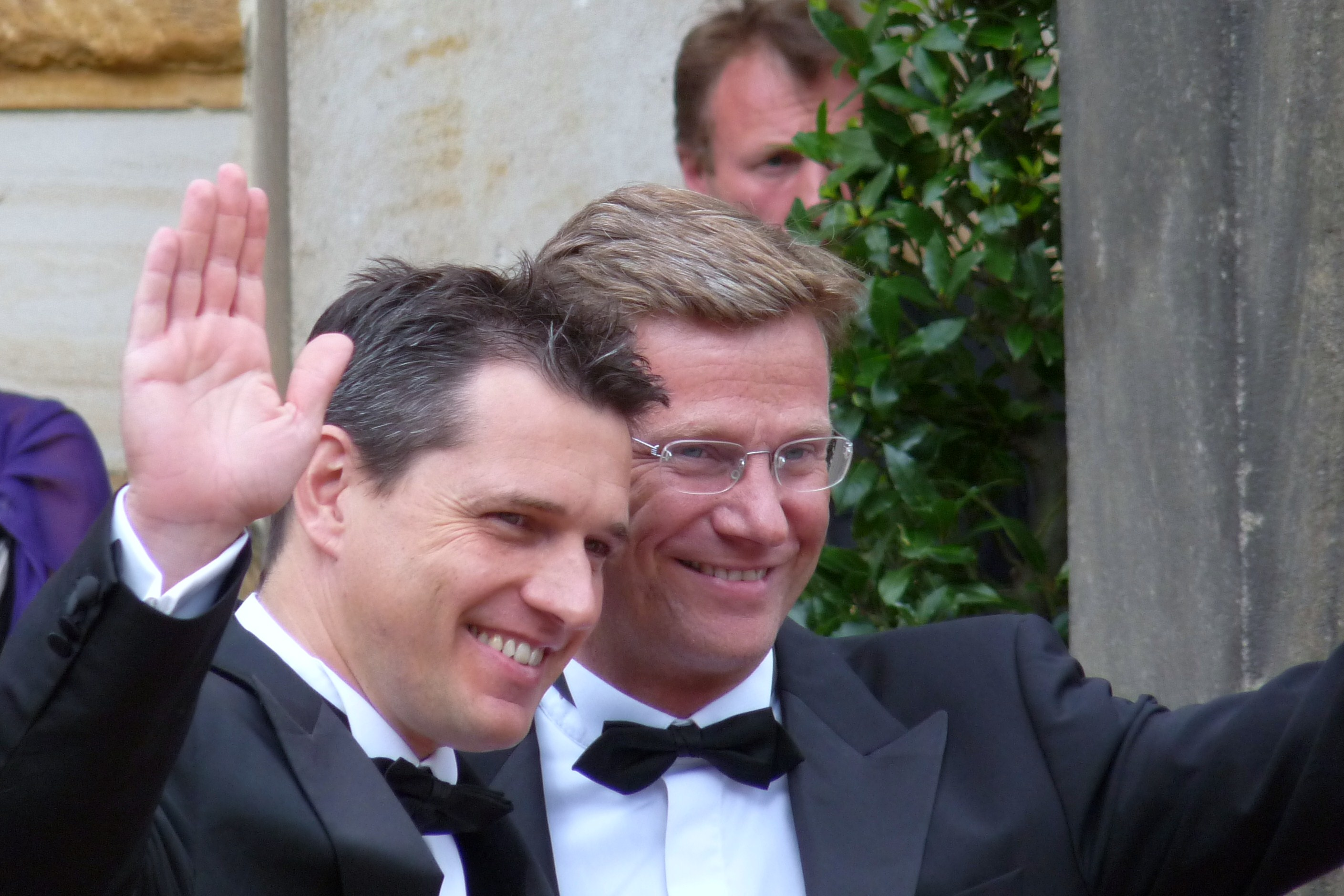
Mronz (left) and his longtime partner, German foreign minister Guido Westerwelle (2009)

In 1989, Mronz organised his first tennis tournament, the Pohland Cup in Cologne, then later the Cologne Open.

Michael Mronz e.K. was founded by Mronz in 1992 as MM Promotion Michael Mronz and was renamed Michael Mronz e.K. in November 2016. The focal point of the events that he organises are sports events such as marathons, equestrian, tennis, beach volleyball and hockey tournaments. Mronz advises companies, associations as well as individual people and clubs on issues concerning sports sponsoring and sports marketing. He is also responsible for the marketing of major TV events, the most well-known of which are Stefan Raab’s Wok World Championships, the Bundesvision Song Contest and the TV total Diving Competition.

Mronz (who himself does not ride) has been the General Manager of the Aachener Reitturnier GmbH (ART) since 1 October 1997, which is responsible for the marketing of the CHIO Aachen, the largest equestrian event in the world. Based on the competences he acquired in this position, Mronz was also appointed Head of the Organising Committee of the World Equestrian Games in 2006, the second largest sporting event in Germany after the Football World Cup that was staged in the same year. For the first time since the Equestrian and Driving World Championships were founded in 1990, this event succeeded in closing on a positive net result. After the great success of the FEI World Equestrian Games, the trade magazine "Horizont" elected Michael Mronz as "Sports Manager of the Year".

In his capacity as marketing director, Mronz was responsible for the marketing and ticketing of the World Athletics Championships in 2009 in Berlin.

In 2002, Mronz became a member of the board of the Hanne-Nüsslein Foundation of the KTHC Red-White stadium. The foundation has set itself the aim of promoting young tennis talents. Up until December 2003, he was shareholder and Managing Director of the American Sports GmbH, under the umbrella of which the first ladies’ and the first men's team of the German basketball league club, RheinEnergie Cologne, fall. He stepped down due to differences of opinion concerning the future alignment of the organisation's structure. Since January 2007, Michael Mronz has been a member of the board of the German America's Cup team, United Internet Team Germany, where he is responsible for the press activities.

Since 2013, he has been the organiser of the famous ATP tournament, BMW Open by FWU AG, in Munich. He advises the organisers of the German racing series DTM and of the 2018 European Athletics Championships in Berlin.

Mronz is the initiator and organiser of the "Rhine-Ruhr Olympic City 2028" initiative that is backed by the private sector. This idea of the Rhine-Ruhr region putting in a bid to stage the 2028 Summer Olympics is being met with great enthusiasm from economic and political circles. Mronz has developed a concept that relies upon sustainability and the usage of existing sports and event facilities.

Mronz took over the Chair of the Westerwelle Foundation in 2016, which asserts itself on an international basis for democracy, the rule of law, the social market economy, tolerance and political and economic participation.

He became an IOC member in 2023.

== Other activities ==
- 1. FC Köln, Member of the advisory board (since 2020)
- "A heart for children", Chairman

== Personal life ==
Mronz was the partner of German FDP politician Guido Westerwelle from 2003 to 2016, when Westerwelle died of leukaemia. Mronz and Westerwelle entered into a registered civil partnership in Bonn on 17 September 2010, at a time when Westerwelle was serving as Germany's Foreign Minister under Chancellor Angela Merkel.
