= Guido Westerwelle =

German politician (1961–2016)

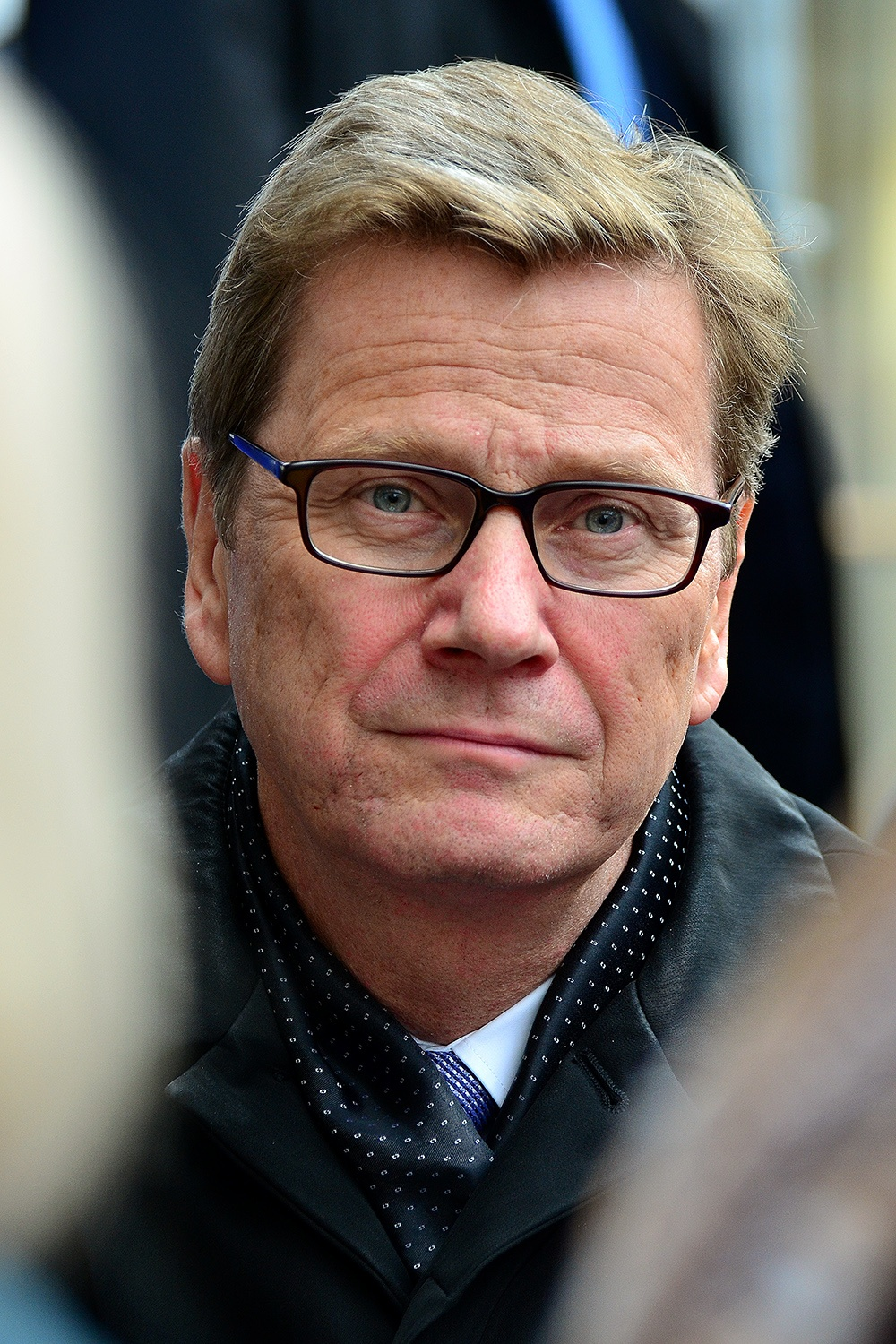
- Westerwelle in 2013

Vice Chancellor of Germany
- In office 28 October 2009 – 16 May 2011
- Chancellor: Angela Merkel
- Preceded by: Frank-Walter Steinmeier
- Succeeded by: Philipp Rösler

Minister of Foreign Affairs
- In office 28 October 2009 – 17 December 2013
- Chancellor: Angela Merkel
- Preceded by: Frank-Walter Steinmeier
- Succeeded by: Frank-Walter Steinmeier

Leader of the Free Democratic Party
- In office 4 May 2001 – 13 May 2011
- General Secretary: Cornelia Pieper; Dirk Niebel; Christian Lindner
- Preceded by: Wolfgang Gerhardt
- Succeeded by: Philipp Rösler

Leader of the Opposition
- In office 1 May 2006 – 22 October 2009
- Chancellor: Angela Merkel
- Preceded by: Wolfgang Gerhardt
- Succeeded by: Frank-Walter Steinmeier

Leader of the Free Democratic Party in the Bundestag
- In office 1 May 2006 – 22 October 2009
- Preceded by: Wolfgang Gerhardt
- Succeeded by: Birgit Homburger

Member of the Bundestag for North Rhine-Westphalia
- In office 8 February 1996 – 22 October 2013
- Preceded by: Heinz Lanfermann
- Succeeded by: Multi-member district
- Constituency: Free Democratic Party List

Personal details
- Born: 27 December 1961 Bad Honnef, West Germany
- Died: 18 March 2016 (aged 54) Cologne, Germany
- Resting place: Melaten cemetery
- Party: Free Democratic Party
- Domestic partner: Michael Mronz (2003–2016)
- Education: University of Bonn; University of Hagen

Guido Westerwelle (German: [ˈɡiːdo ˈvɛstɐˌvɛlə]; 27 December 1961 – 18 March 2016) was a German politician who served as foreign minister in the second cabinet of Chancellor Angela Merkel and Vice-Chancellor of Germany from 2009 to 2011, being the first openly gay person to hold any of these positions. He also led the liberal Free Democratic Party (FDP) from 2001 until he stepped down in 2011. A lawyer by profession, he was a member of the Bundestag from 1996 to 2013.

== Early life and education ==
Guido Westerwelle was born in Bad Honnef in the German state of North Rhine-Westphalia. His parents were lawyers. He graduated from Ernst Moritz Arndt Gymnasium in 1980 after academic struggles resulted in his departure from previous institutions where he was considered an average student at best, but substandard otherwise. He studied law at the University of Bonn from 1980 to 1987. Following the First and Second State Law Examinations in 1987 and 1991 respectively, he began practising as an attorney in Bonn in 1991. In 1994, he earned a doctoral degree in law from the University of Hagen.

== Career in the FDP ==
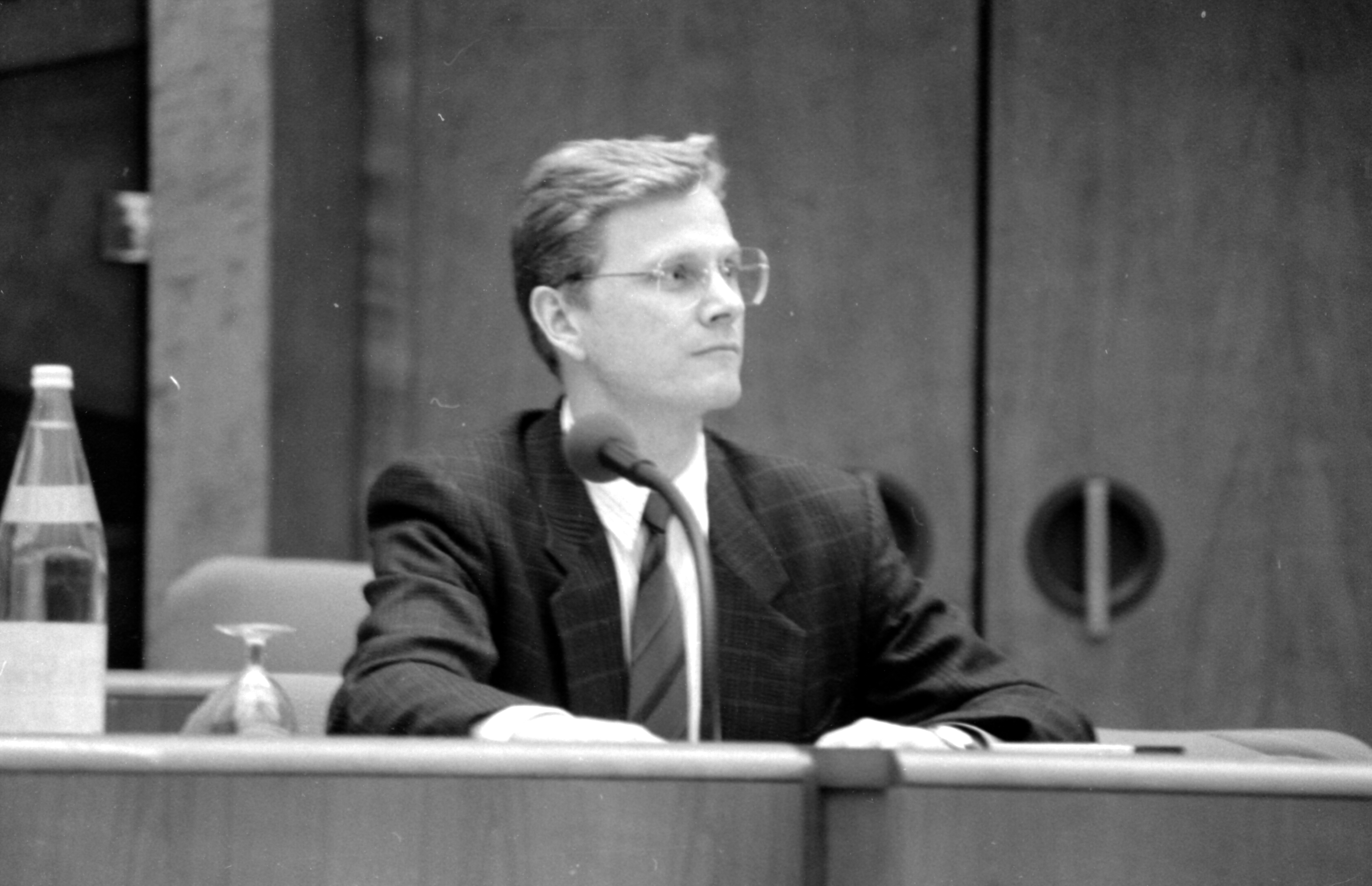
Westerwelle in 1988

Westerwelle joined the Free Democratic Party (FDP) in 1980. He was a founding member of the Junge Liberale (Young Liberals), which became the party's official youth organization in 1983, and he was its chairman from 1983 to 1988. In a 1988 newspaper interview, he singled out the FDP's rejection of an amnesty for tax offenders and its diminished enthusiasm for nuclear power as fruits of the youth wing's labors.

He was a member of the executive board of the FDP from 1988, and in 1994, he was appointed secretary general of the party.

In 1996, Westerwelle was first elected a member of the Bundestag, filling in for Heinz Lanfermann, who had resigned from his seat after entering the Ministry of Justice. In the 1998 national elections, he was re-elected to parliament. As his parliamentary group's home affairs spokesman, he was instrumental in swinging the FDP behind a 1999 government bill to make German citizenship available to children born in Germany of non-German parents.

In 2001, Westerwelle succeeded Wolfgang Gerhardt as party chairman. Gerhardt, however, remained chairman of the FDP's parliamentary group. Westerwelle, the youngest party chairman at the time, emphasized economics and education, and espoused a strategy initiated by his deputy Jürgen Möllemann, who, as chairman of the North Rhine-Westphalia branch of the FDP, had led his party back into the state parliament, gaining 9.8% of the vote. This strategy, transferred to the federal level, was dubbed Project 18, referring both to the envisioned percentage and the German age of majority. Leading up to the 2002 elections, he positioned his party equidistantly from the major parties and refused to commit his party to a coalition with either the Christian Democrats or the Social Democrats. He was also named the FDP's candidate for the office of chancellor. Since the FDP had never claimed such a candidacy (and hasn't done since) and had no chance of attaining it against the two major parties, this move was widely seen as political marketing alongside other ploys, such as driving around in a campaign van dubbed the Guidomobile, wearing the figure 18 on the soles of his shoes or appearing in the Big Brother TV show. Eventually, the federal elections yielded a slight increase of the FDP's vote from 6.2% to 7.4%. Despite this setback, he was reelected as party chairman in 2003.

In the federal elections of 2005, Westerwelle was his party's front-runner. When neither Chancellor Gerhard Schröder's Social Democrats and Greens nor a coalition of Christian and Free Democrats, favored by Angela Merkel and Westerwelle, managed to gain a majority of seats, Westerwelle rejected overtures by Chancellor Schröder to save his chancellorship by entering his coalition, preferring to become one of the leaders of the disparate opposition of the subsequently formed "Grand Coalition" of Christian and Social Democrats, with Merkel as chancellor. Westerwelle became a vocal critic of the new government. In 2006, according to an internal agreement, Westerwelle succeeded Wolfgang Gerhardt as chairman of the parliamentary group.

Over the following years, in an effort to broaden the party's appeal, Westerwelle embraced its left wing under former justice minister Sabine Leutheusser-Schnarrenberger and focused his campaign messages on tax cuts, education and civil rights.

== Foreign Minister and Vice-Chancellor of Germany ==
In the federal elections of 2009, Westerwelle committed his party to a coalition with Merkel's CDU/CSU, ruling out a coalition with Social Democrats and Greens, and led his party to an unprecedented 14.6% share of the vote. In accordance with earlier announcements, he formed a coalition government with the CDU/CSU.

On 28 October, Westerwelle was sworn in as Foreign Minister and Vice-Chancellor, becoming the head of the Foreign Office. His deputies at the Foreign Office were his close political ally Cornelia Pieper and foreign policy expert Werner Hoyer as Ministers of State. Hoyer had previously held the same office in the fifth Kohl cabinet. In a much-discussed move, Westerwelle travelled to Poland, the Netherlands and Belgium before visiting France.

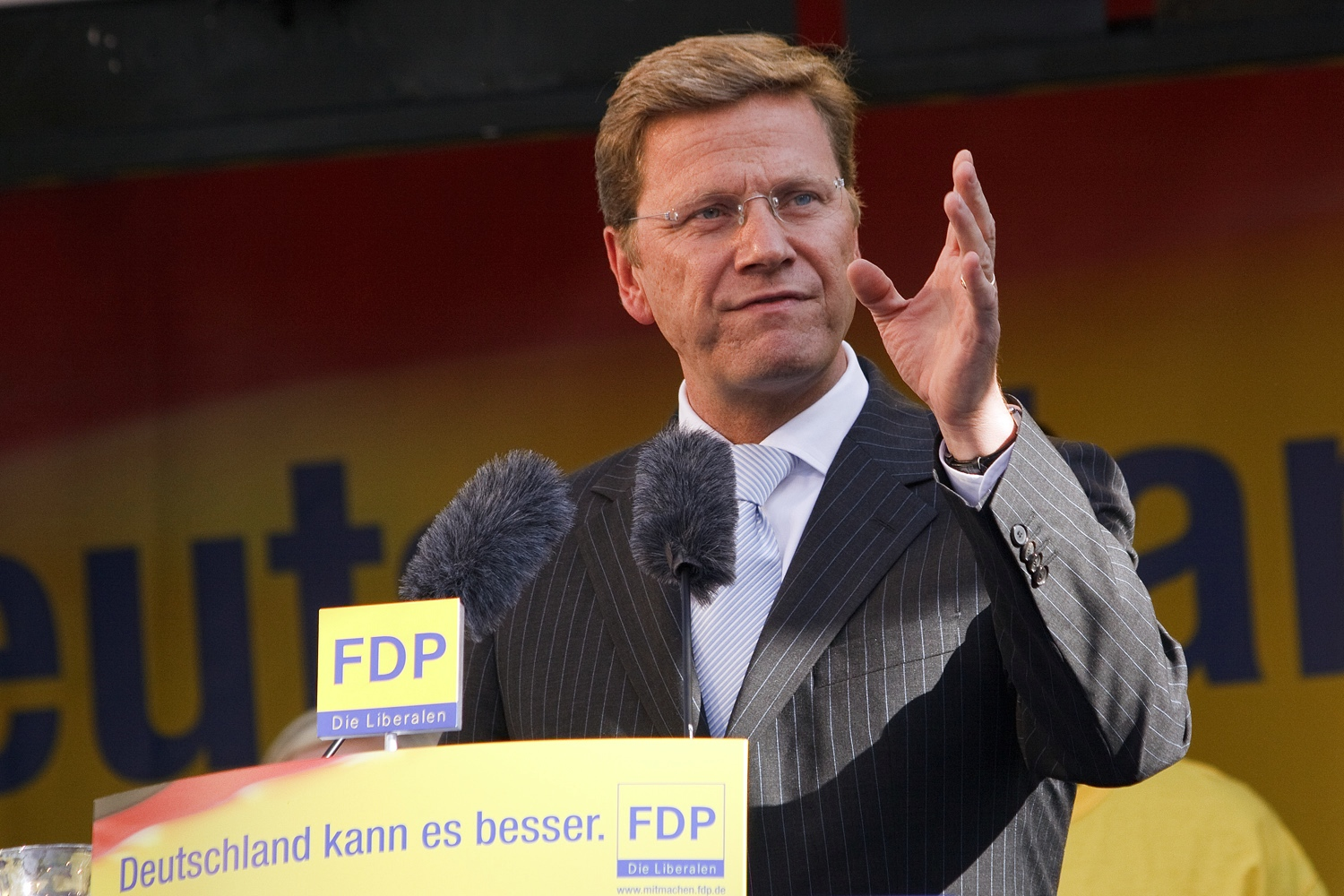
Westerwelle speaking at an election rally in Hamm, 2009

On 19 November 2009, Westerwelle joined around 800 dignitaries from around the world – including US Secretary of State Hillary Clinton, French Foreign Minister Bernard Kouchner and British Foreign Secretary David Miliband – to witness Afghan president Hamid Karzai's swearing in for a second term in office.

=== WikiLeaks controversy and election defeats ===
In late November 2010, leaked U.S. diplomatic cables revealed that American diplomats considered Westerwelle an obstacle to deeper transatlantic relations and were skeptical of his abilities, with one cable comparing him unfavorably to former German foreign minister Hans-Dietrich Genscher. On 3 December 2010, Westerwelle dismissed his personal assistant Helmut Metzner following a WikiLeaks diplomatic cables release which led to Metzner admitting that he regularly spied for the U.S. By May 2011, opinion polls ranked Westerwelle as one of the most unpopular and ineffective foreign ministers since the late 1940s. At the time, his party had collapsed in several states, including Rhineland-Palatinate and Bremen where they failed to secure the 5% threshold necessary for a seat in parliament. Analysts said one of the main reasons Westerwelle had become so unpopular was that he had been unable to fulfill the expectations of his voters, the majority of whom were middle-class professionals or entrepreneurs. Westerwelle subsequently stepped down as party leader. By July the party was only receiving 3% support in opinion polls, a record low, reflecting what political insiders had called his "last stand" in January, comparing Westerwelle and his party to Captain Ahab and the Pequod.

=== International crisis ===
During his tenure as foreign minister, Westerwelle prevailed over lawmakers in his party who opposed bailing out Greece during the European debt crisis. Amid efforts by the United States and European nations to isolate Iran's then-president, Mahmoud Ahmadinejad, Westerwelle traveled to Tehran in February 2011 to bring home two journalists for the weekly newspaper Bild am Sonntag who were released after being arrested in October 2010. After weeks of negotiations, the Iranians reached out to discuss the release of the pair, the reporter Marcus Hellwig and the photographer Jens Koch. The two reporters had been arrested while interviewing the son of Sakineh Mohammadi Ashtiani, a woman sentenced to death for adultery. A condition of their release was that Westerwelle meet with Ahmadinejad, causing Iranian exile groups in Europe to condemn the visit and to argue that Germany was bowing to the Tehran government at a time when security forces were cracking down on pro-democracy demonstrators. When Iran briefly refused to allow a plane carrying German Chancellor Angela Merkel to India to cross its air space in May 2011, Westerwelle summoned Iran's ambassador to Germany, Alireza Sheikhattar, complaining about "a disrespect for Germany that we will not accept." He later temporarily recalled Germany's ambassador to Iran for consultation after an attack on the British Embassy in Tehran in November 2011. In November 2010, Westerwelle became the first German minister to visit Gaza since the territory was sealed off by the Israeli army at the end of 2007.

In April 2011, Westerwelle summoned China's ambassador to Germany, Wu Hongbo, for a meeting about detained Chinese artist-activist Ai Weiwei, calling for his release and denouncing China's growing use of extrajudicial detentions against dissidents.

In September 2012, Westerwelle joined his Jordanian counterpart Nasser Judeh in visiting the Zaatari refugee camp to learn more about the plight of Syrians fleeing the violence in the ongoing Syrian civil war that erupted in 2011.

After the offices of both the Konrad Adenauer Foundation in St Petersburg and the Friedrich Ebert Foundation in Moscow were investigated by prosecutors and tax inspectors in March 2013, Westerwelle summoned the envoy at the Russian embassy in Berlin to relay his "concern over the concerted action".

On 4 December 2013, Westerwelle walked with opposition leaders through an encampment on Kiev's Maidan Nezalezhnosti, the focus of protests over the Yanukovych government's U-turn away from the European Union and toward Russia; Russian Prime Minister Dmitry Medvedev subsequently called any participation by foreign officials in the political events unfolding in Ukraine "interference in internal affairs."

=== Arab Spring ===
When the insurgency against Libya's dictator Muammar Gaddafi broke out in early 2011, Westerwelle promptly stated his support for the repressed opposition. Earlier, he had initially been cautious before making any pronouncements about Tunisia and Egypt, but in the case of Libya, he quickly called out Gaddafi as a dictator, and argued in favor of EU-level sanctions against the regime in Tripoli. Strongly motivated by a widespread aversion in Germany to the use of military force, he shared with Chancellor Merkel a deep scepticism about a no-fly zone as it was suggested by France and the United Kingdom. At a UN Security Council meeting in March 2011, Westerwelle abstained in the vote on United Nations Security Council Resolution 1973 to establish a no-fly zone, along with veto powers Russia and China as well as Brazil and India. Shortly after, he expelled five Libyan diplomats for intimidating Libyan citizens living in Germany. During a visit to Benghazi in June 2011, Westerwelle announced that Germany would recognize the rebel National Transitional Council as the legitimate representative of Libyans.

Amid the Egyptian Revolution of 2011, Westerwelle visited the country six times between February 2011 and November 2012. In December 2011, he summoned Ramzy Ezzeldin Ramzy, the Egyptian ambassador in Berlin, to protest over what he called an "unacceptable" raid on the Cairo office of the Konrad Adenauer Foundation among those searched during a crackdown on pro-democracy and human rights organizations. In February 2012, he harshly criticized Egypt for trying 44 people, including German citizens, over the alleged illegal funding of aid groups. When the Konrad Adenauer Foundation was ordered to close in Abu Dhabi later that year, Westerwelle personally pressed his UAE counterpart Abdullah bin Zayed Al Nahyan to rethink the decision.

=== Crisis in Sudan ===
In June 2011, Westerwelle became the first German foreign minister to travel to Darfur, where he visited the United Nations/African Union operation UNAMID toward which Germany had contributed military, police and civilian personnel. He was also the first to visit South Sudan shortly before its independence, where he met the country's founding President Salva Kiir; as the rotating chair of the UN Security Council at the time, Germany was responsible for accepting the newly independent country into the United Nations. During his trip, however, he made no appointment to meet Sudanese President Omar al-Bashir who is wanted by the International Criminal Court on charges of war crimes, crimes against humanity and genocide allegedly committed in Darfur.

In September 2012, Westerwelle summoned the Sudanese ambassador in Berlin after violent attacks on Germany's embassy in Khartoum, and called on the Sudanese government to guarantee the security of the embassy; thousands of protesters had previously vandalized the embassies of Germany and Britain, outraged by Innocence of Muslims, a film which has been described as denigrating to the Islamic prophet, Muhammad.

=== Role in the United Nations ===
During July 2011, Westerwelle was the President of the United Nations Security Council as he headed the German delegation to the United Nations. In an attempt to continue to play an important role within the United Nations, he led the German government's successful campaign for a three-year seat on the United Nations Human Rights Council in late 2012.

In October 2013, Israeli daily Haaretz published the text of a letter sent by Westerwelle to Prime Minister Benjamin Netanyahu, saying that failure to appear at a periodical hearing regarding human rights at the United Nations Human Rights Council would cause severe diplomatic damage to Israel, and that its allies around the world would be hard-pressed to help it. Shortly after, Israel renewed its cooperation with the Human Rights Council after a year and a half of boycott.

=== Nonproliferation ===
During his time in office, Westerwelle campaigned for the removal of B61 nuclear bombs at US air bases in Europe, arguing that a planned missile shield protecting Europe against ballistic rocket attack also meant that the tactical nuclear bombs are not needed. Against resistance from France, Westerwelle and German defense minister Karl-Theodor zu Guttenberg demanded greater NATO commitment to nuclear disarmament at a meeting of the organization's foreign and defense ministers in October 2010. After the U.S. midterm elections in 2010, Westerwelle called on newly empowered Republicans in the U.S. Congress to stand by President Barack Obama's goals of non- proliferation and the eventual elimination of nuclear weapons.

In coordination with his foundation and The ATOM Project, Westerwelle continued to advocate for the elimination of nuclear weapons testing.

=== Relations with Belarus ===
In the belief that the European Union had to engage Belarus to prevent it from moving closer to Russia, Westerwelle – accompanied by his Polish counterpart Radek Sikorski – visited Minsk in November 2010, the first such visit in 15 years. Shortly after, Westerwelle publicly condemned the judgments against President Alexander Lukashenko's main political opponent Andrei Sannikov and other opposition supporters. As a consequence, Poland, France and Germany pressed their EU partners in to impose tougher sanctions against the Belarusian leadership following the crackdown and trials of opposition leaders in the country who held peaceful protests against the fraudulent presidential elections.

In March 2012, Lukashenko criticized EU politicians who threatened him with further sanctions over human rights abuses and in an apparent riposte to Westerwelle branding him "Europe's last dictator," said: "Better to be a dictator than gay." Westerwelle subsequently responded: "This statement condemns itself. I won't budge one millimeter from my commitment to human rights and democracy in Belarus after these comments."

=== Relations with Russia ===
While being foreign minister, Westerwelle maintained a fairly low profile when it came to Germany's Russia-policy. He supported the policy of "change through trade" with Russia, but was widely criticized for not having a clear foreign policy doctrine. He called for more inclusion of Russia in the international community, but criticized Moscow, for example, for supporting President Assad's government in Syria.

=== Views on WWII and its aftermath ===
Upon taking office, Westerwelle opposed the appointment of Erika Steinbach, a German politician and member of Chancellor Merkel's party, to a board overseeing the creation of the Center against Expulsions, a place documenting the expulsion of Germans from Eastern Europe after World War II. In November 2010, together with his Russian counterpart Sergey Lavrov, he opened the Nuremberg Trials Memorial permanent exhibition in the Palace of Justice building in Nuremberg.

Under Westerwelle's leadership, the Foreign Office released a report in 2011 called "The Ministry and the Past", which alleged the ministry's collusion with the Nazis. Westerwelle said the report "shamed" the institution. In February 2012, he signed an agreement granting 10 million euros (13 million dollars) to Israel's Yad Vashem Holocaust Memorial Center over the following 10 years.

Following the controversial 2012 Munich artworks discovery, he called for greater transparency in dealing with the find, which he warned could have lasting damage to Germany's international friendships.

== Political positions ==
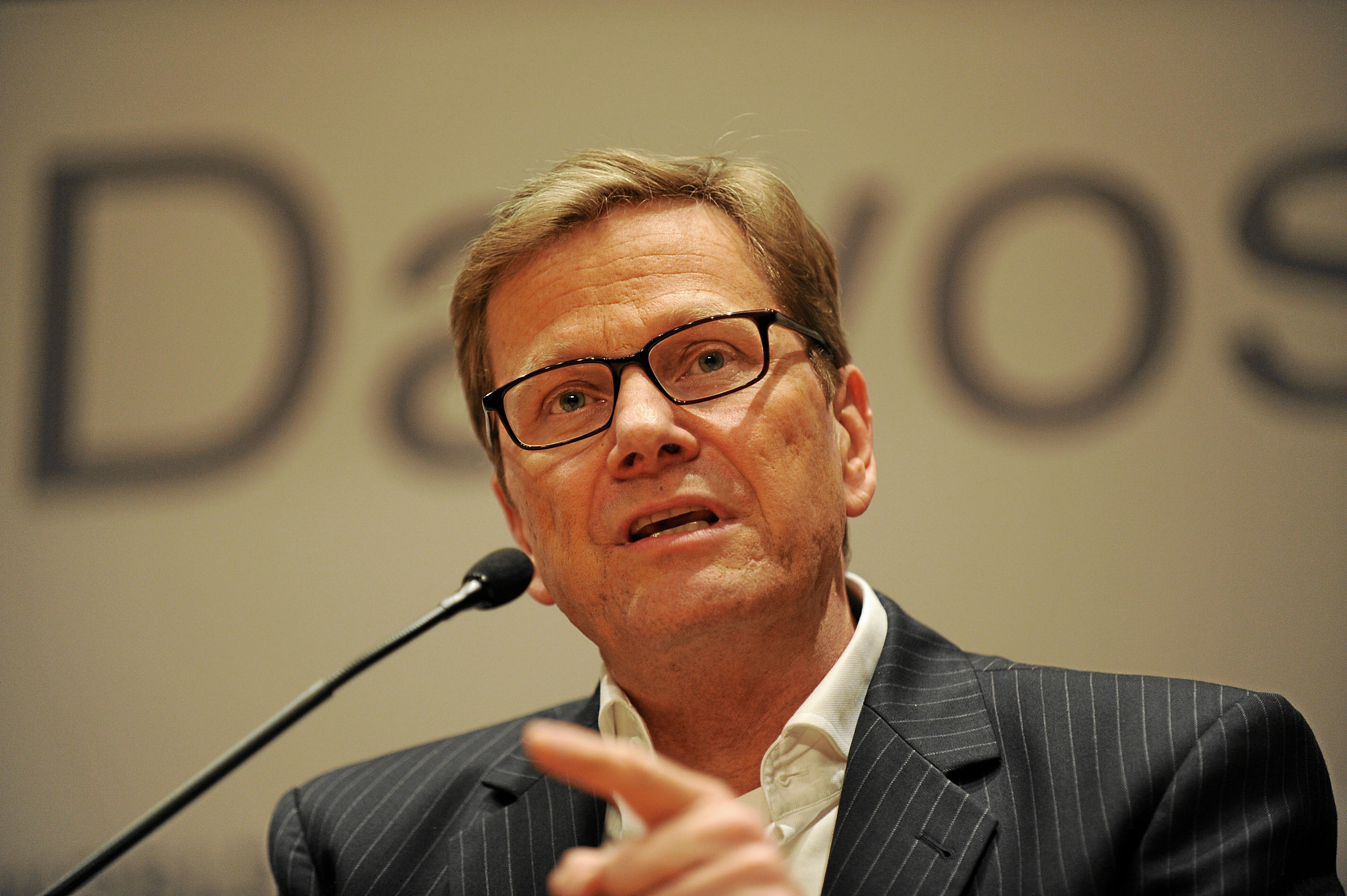
Westerwelle speaking at the World Economic Forum, 2013

=== On economic policy ===
Westerwelle was a staunch supporter of the free market and proposed reforms to curtail the German welfare state and deregulate German labor-law. In an interview in February 2003, Westerwelle described labor unions as a "plague on our country" and said union officials were "the pall bearers of the welfare state and of the prosperity in our country". He called for substantial tax cuts and smaller government, in line with the general direction of his party.

=== On sexual equality ===
Westerwelle was a staunch campaigner for sexual equality. He long criticized German laws not giving complete adoption rights to gay couples. In 2012, he and Finance Minister Wolfgang Schäuble were at loggerheads after a high-court ruling demanded the government provide equal tax treatment to gay civil servants and armed forces members. In the German daily Bild, Westerwelle said that if "registered partnerships have the same responsibilities as married couples, then they should have the same rights. It is not weakening marriage but ending discrimination. We do not live in the 1950s."

=== On data-protection ===
In 2001, Westerwelle was one of the first politicians to push for a biometric passport. He opposed Google Street View's automated photography of streetscapes, and stated "I will do all I can to prevent it". In 2013, he announced plans to launch an initiative at the United Nations General Assembly to agree an optional protocol to the International Covenant on Civil and Political Rights that would give greater data protection to internet users.

== Controversy ==
Westerwelle's party chairmanship saw considerable controversy. Critics inside and outside the FDP accused him of focusing on public relations, as opposed to developing and promoting sound public policy, especially in the election campaign of 2002. Westerwelle himself, who was made party chairman particularly because his predecessor Wolfgang Gerhardt had been viewed by many as dull and stiff, labelled his approach as Spaßpolitik (fun-politics).

In 2006, former Chancellor Gerhard Schröder won a court order against Westerwelle who had criticized Schröder for accepting a lucrative job at Gazprom, the Russian state-owned gas company, soon after losing the parliamentary election to Angela Merkel. Despite losing, Westerwelle said he would stick to his original assessment that Schröder's appointment as chairman of the North European Gas Pipeline Company was "problematic".

On 27 September 2009, at a press conference after the election, Westerwelle refused to answer a question in English from a BBC reporter, stating that "it is normal to speak German in Germany". Critics have noted that this was in part due to Westerwelle's poor command of English. He earned the epithet "Westerwave" (a literal translation of his surname into English) as a consequence of these remarks.

Westerwelle made public statements in 2010 about the "welfare state", saying that promising the people effortless prosperity may lead to "late Roman decadence", in reference to a verdict in the Federal Constitutional Court of Germany regarding Hartz IV.

In 2010, Westerwelle announced he would not be taking his civil partner Michael Mronz to anti-gay countries. Other official trips as foreign minister included Mronz, an event manager, and Ralf Marohn, a partner in his brother's company, also causing controversy. Westerwelle retorted that it was normal for foreign ministers to take industry representatives on their trips, calling himself a victim of "a left-wing zeitgeist that considers making business questionable".

According to Politico Europe Westerwelle contributed to the decline of the power of the German foreign ministry due to his lack of expertise in the area and was considered ineffective in the role.

== Other activities (selection) ==
=== Corporate boards ===
- KfW, ex-officio member of the Board of Supervisory Directors (2009–2013)
- ARAG Group, member of the supervisory board (2005–2009)
- Deutsche Vermögensberatung, member of the advisory board (2005–2009)
- TellSell Consulting, member of the advisory board (2005–2009)

=== Non-profit organizationss ===
- Bertelsmann Stiftung, member of the Board of Trustees (2015–2016)
- ZDF, ex-officio member of the Television Board (1998–2006)

== Recognition (selection) ==
- 2006 – Honorary doctorate of the Hanyang University, Seoul
- 2013 – Order of Merit of the Republic of Poland (Komtur mit Stern)
- 2013 – Orden del Mérito Civil of Spain

== Personal life ==
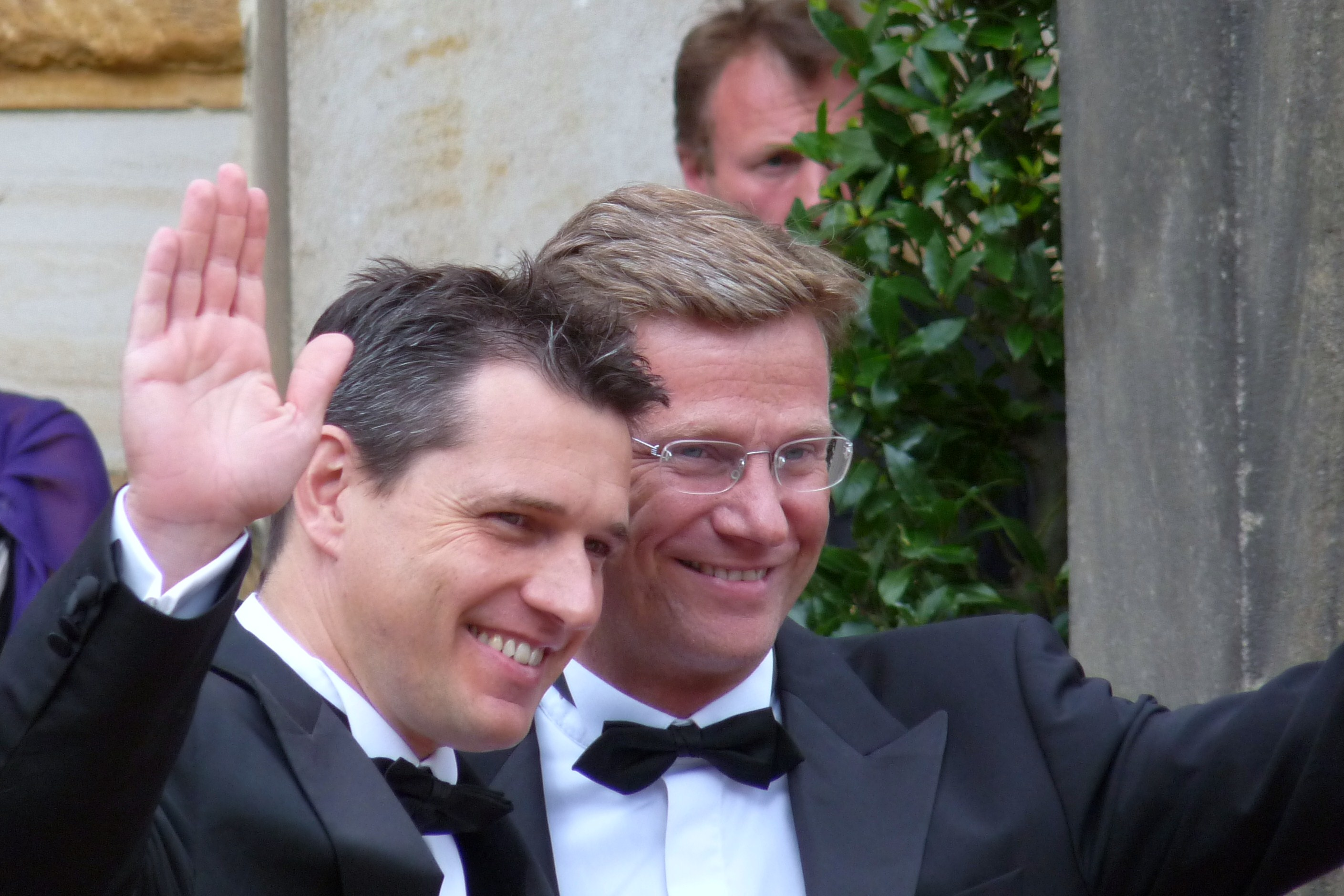
Westerwelle (right) and his partner Michael Mronz in 2009

On 20 July 2004, Westerwelle attended Angela Merkel's 50th birthday party accompanied by his partner, Michael Mronz. It was the first time he had attended an official event with his partner and this was considered his public coming-out. The couple registered their partnership on 17 September 2010 in a private ceremony in Bonn.

== Death ==
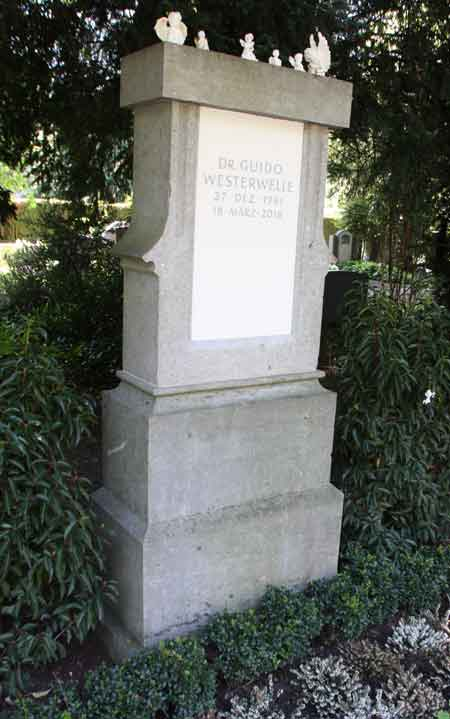
Tombstone of Guido Westerwelle

On 20 June 2014, it was reported that Westerwelle was suffering from acute myeloid leukemia. He underwent chemotherapy and a bone-marrow transplant. He last appeared in public in November 2015, presenting a book on his battle with blood cancer called Between Two Lives. Westerwelle died of the disease in Cologne on 18 March 2016, at the age of 54.

== Bibliography ==
- Guido Westerwelle, the Liberals' Top Gun Profile in Deutsche Welle, 20 July 2005

Party political offices
Preceded by Wolfgang Gerhardt	Leader of the Free Democratic Party; 2001–2011	Succeeded by Philipp Rösler
Political offices
Preceded by Frank-Walter Steinmeier	Minister for Foreign Affairs; 2009–2013	Succeeded by Frank-Walter Steinmeier
Preceded by Frank-Walter Steinmeier	Vice-Chancellor of Germany; 2009–2011	Succeeded by Philipp Rösler
