= Wolfgang Gerhardt =

German politician (1943–2024)

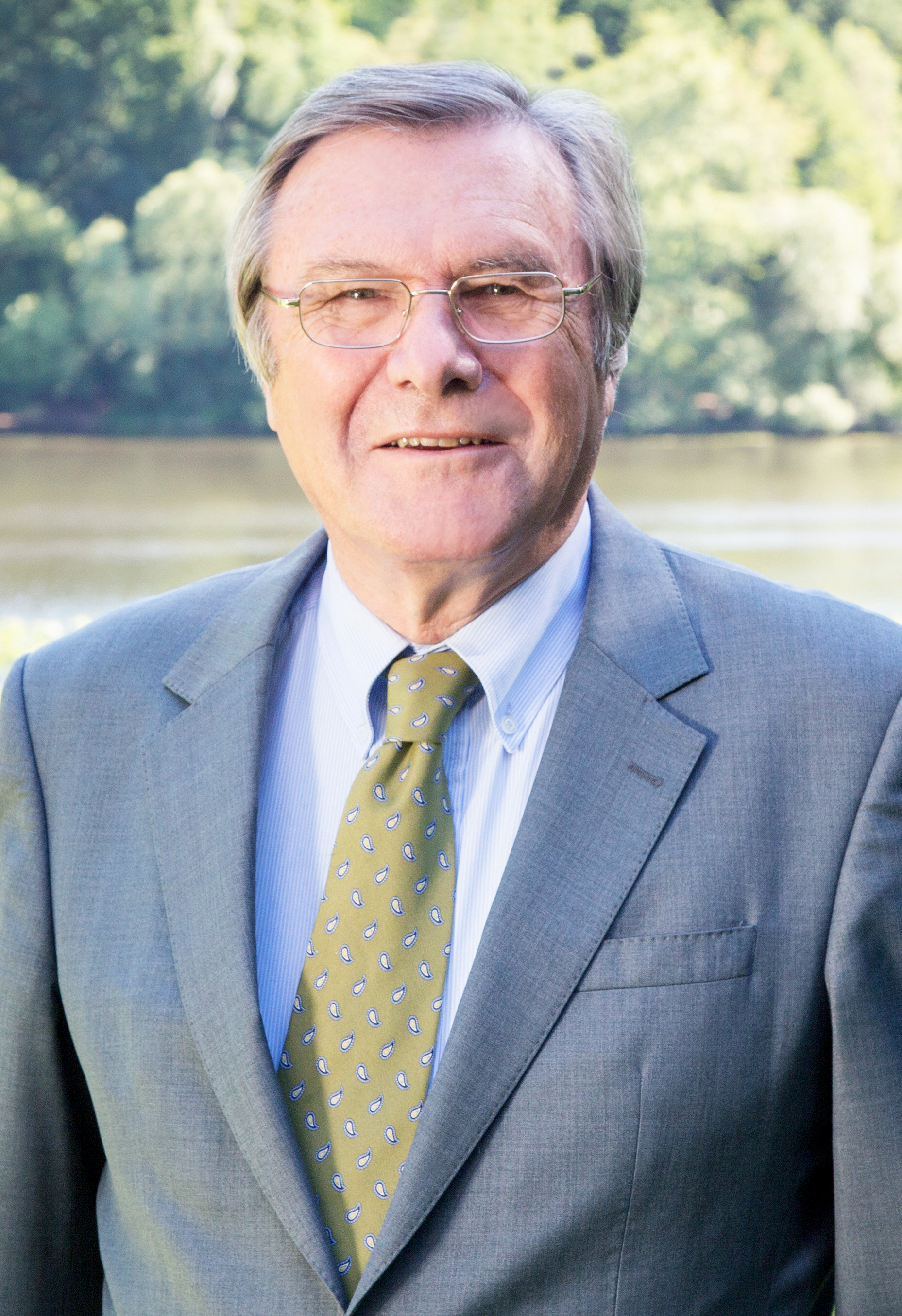
- Gerhardt in 2016

Leader of the Opposition
- In office 22 November 2005 – 1 May 2006
- Chancellor: Angela Merkel
- Preceded by: Angela Merkel
- Succeeded by: Guido Westerwelle

Leader of the Free Democratic Party in the Bundestag
- In office 5 October 1998 – 1 May 2006
- Preceded by: Hermann Otto Solms
- Succeeded by: Guido Westerwelle

Leader of the Free Democratic Party
- In office 10 June 1995 – 4 May 2001
- Deputy: Cornielia Schmatz-Jacobsen; Jürgen Bohn; Rainer Brüderle; Cornelia Pieper; Walter Döring
- Preceded by: Klaus Kinkel
- Succeeded by: Guido Westerwelle

Deputy Leader of the Free Democratic Party
- In office 23 February 1985 – 10 June 1995
- Leader: Martin Bangemann; Otto Graf Lambsdorff; Klaus Kinkel
- Preceded by: Jürgen Morlok
- Succeeded by: Rainer Brüderle

Deputy Minister President of Hesse
- In office 24 April 1987 – 5 April 1991
- Minister President: Walter Wallmann
- Preceded by: Hans Krollmann
- Succeeded by: Joschka Fischer

Representative of Hesse to the Federation
- In office 24 April 1987 – 5 April 1991
- Minister President: Walter Wallmann
- Preceded by: Willi Görlach
- Succeeded by: Ulrike Rieder

Hessian Minister of Science and Art
- In office 24 April 1987 – 5 April 1991
- Minister President: Walter Wallmann
- Preceded by: Vera Rüdiger
- Succeeded by: Evelies Mayer

Member of the Bundestag for Hesse
- In office 16 October 1994 – 22 September 2013
- Constituency: Free Democratic List

Personal details
- Born: 31 December 1943 Ulrichstein, Gau Hesse-Nassau, Greater German Reich
- Died: 13 September 2024 (aged 80) Wiesbaden, Hesse, Germany
- Party: German: Free Democratic Party; EU: Alliance of Liberals and Democrats for Europe
- Education: Marburg University (Dr. phil.)

Wolfgang Gerhardt (31 December 1943 – 13 September 2024) was a German politician and the leader of the Free Democratic Party of Germany (FDP) from 1995 until he was succeeded by Guido Westerwelle in 2001.

== Political career ==
Gerhardt was born in Ulrichstein, Hesse. He studied pedagogics, political science and German studies and completed his doctorate 1970 in Marburg. He was a member of the Landtag of Hesse from 1978 until 1994. Between 1987 and 1991, he served as State Minister for Science and Culture and Deputy Minister-President in the state government of Minister-President Walter Wallmann of Hesse. In this capacity, he was one of the state's representatives on the Bundesrat.

Gerhardt was member of the Deutscher Bundestag from 1994 to 2013. Gerhardt served as chair of the Free Democratic Party from 1995 to 2001 and also chaired its grouping in the Bundestag from 1998 to 2006.

From 2002 until 2012, Gerhardt was Vice President of Liberal International (LI), under the leadership of successive presidents Annemie Neyts-Uyttebroeck (2002–2005), John Alderdice (2005–2009), and Hans van Baalen (2009–2011).

Ahead of the 2005 national elections, Gerhard was billed as a possible foreign minister in a new centre-right coalition with the Christian Democrats; instead, newly elected Chancellor Angela Merkel entered a coalition with the Social Democratic Party. From 2006 to 2018, Gerhardt served as chairman of the board of the Friedrich Naumann Foundation.

== Political positions ==
Gerhardt campaigned for a free pluralistic society and advocated for personal responsibility and independent judgment. He was concerned about fair educational opportunities.

For some of his opponents, Gerhardt was too calm. He was succeeded in his most influential positions as Leader of the Opposition, Leader of the Free Democratic Party in the Bundestag and Leader of the Free Democratic Party by Guido Westerwelle.

== Other activities ==
=== Corporate boards ===
- Alte Leipziger Lebensversicherung aG, Member of the Advisory Board
- Hallesche-Nationale Krankenversicherung aG, Member of the Advisory Board
- Rücker AG, Member of the Supervisory Board
- Deutsche Vermögensberatung (DVAG), Member of the Advisory Board (1995)

=== Non-profits ===
- Theodor Heuss House, Chairman of the Board of Trustees
- Max Planck Institute for Heart and Lung Research, Member of the Board of Trustees
- German Association for Small and Medium-Sized Businesses (BVMW), Member of the Political Advisory Board
- Memorial to the Murdered Jews of Europe, Member of the Advisory Board
- German Institute for International and Security Affairs (SWP), Member of the Council (2005–2013)
- Turkey: Culture of Change Initiative (TCCI), Member of the Advisory Board

== Personal life and death ==
Gerhardt was married and had two children. He died in Wiesbaden, Hesse, on 13 September 2024, at the age of 80.

== Writings ==
- Gerhardt, Wolfgang (1997). Es geht (in German). München: Ferenczy bei Bruckmann. ISBN 978-3-7654-2883-8.

=== Dissertation ===
- Gerhardt, Wolfgang (1971). Die bildungspolitische Diskussion in der FDP von 1945–1951 (in German). OCLC 612941060.
