= Second Merkel cabinet =

Government of Germany from 2009 to 2013

Second Cabinet of Angela Merkel Cabinet Merkel II
- 21st Cabinet of the Federal Republic of Germany
- 28 October 2009 – 22 October 2013 (until 17 December 2013 as caretaker government)
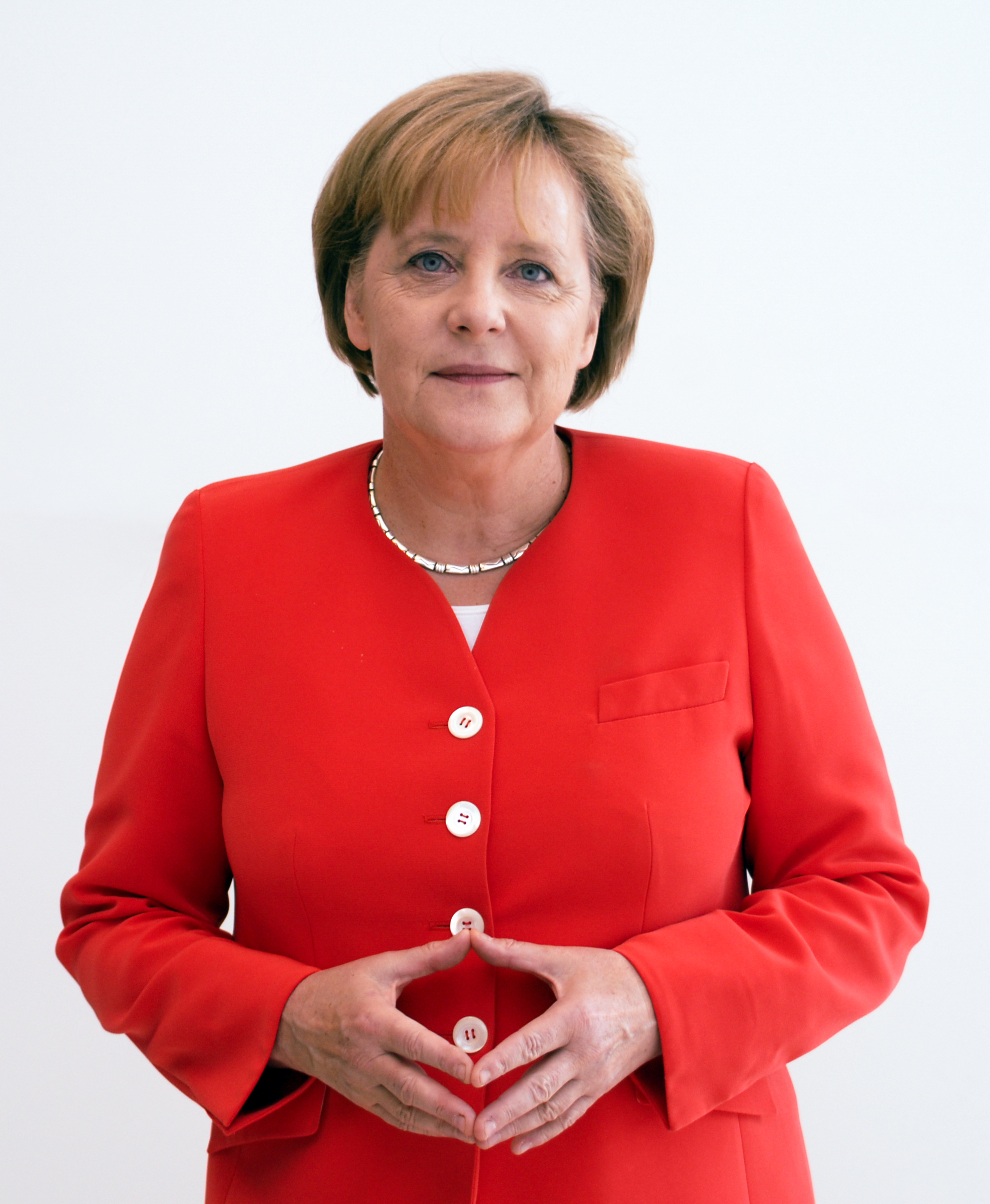
- Date formed: 28 October 2009
- Date dissolved: 17 December 2013 (4 years, 1 month, 2 weeks and 5 days)

People and organisations
- President: Horst Köhler (until 31 May 2010); Jens Böhrnsen (acting; from 31 May 2010 to 30 June 2010); Christian Wulff (from 30 June 2010 to 17 February 2012); Horst Seehofer (acting; from 17 February 2012 to 18 March 2012); Joachim Gauck (from 18 March 2012)
- Chancellor: Angela Merkel
- Vice Chancellor: Guido Westerwelle (until 18 May 2011); Philipp Rösler (from 18 May 2011)
- Member party: Christian Democratic Union; Christian Social Union of Bavaria; Free Democratic Party
- Status in legislature: Coalition government
- Opposition party: Social Democratic Party; The Left; The Greens
- Opposition leader: Frank-Walter Steinmeier (SPD)

History
- Election: 2009 federal election
- Legislature terms: 17th Bundestag
- Predecessor: Merkel I
- Successor: Merkel III

The Second Merkel cabinet (German: Kabinett Merkel II) was the Government of the Federal Republic of Germany during the 17th legislative session of the Bundestag. Installed after the 2009 federal election, it left office on 17 December 2013. It was preceded by the first Merkel cabinet and succeeded by the third Merkel cabinet. Led by Chancellor Angela Merkel, it was supported by a coalition of the Christian Democratic Union (CDU), the Christian Social Union of Bavaria (CSU), and the Free Democratic Party (FDP).

The cabinet served as a caretaker government following the elections on 22 September 2013; which saw the removal of the Free Democratic Party from the Bundestag. Negotiations between the Christian Democratic Union/Christian Social Union of Bavaria (CDU/CSU) and the Social Democratic Party (SPD) took place to form a new cabinet.

== Composition ==
Cabinet members
| Portfolio | Minister | Took office | Left office | Party |
|---|---|---|---|---|
| Chancellor | Angela Merkel | 28 October 2009 | 17 December 2013 | CDU |
| Vice Chancellor | Guido Westerwelle | 28 October 2009 | 18 May 2011 | FDP |
| Vice Chancellor | Philipp Rösler | 18 May 2011 | 17 December 2013 | FDP |
| Federal Minister of Foreign Affairs | Guido Westerwelle | 28 October 2009 | 17 December 2013 | FDP |
| Federal Minister of Defense | Karl-Theodor zu Guttenberg | 28 October 2009 | 3 March 2011 | CSU |
| Federal Minister of Defense | Thomas de Maizière | 3 March 2011 | 17 December 2013 | CDU |
| Federal Minister of the Interior | Thomas de Maizière | 28 October 2009 | 3 March 2011 | CDU |
| Federal Minister of the Interior | Hans-Peter Friedrich | 3 March 2011 | 17 December 2013 | CSU |
| Federal Minister of Finance | Wolfgang Schäuble | 28 October 2009 | 17 December 2013 | CDU |
| Federal Minister of Justice | Sabine Leutheusser-Schnarrenberger | 28 October 2009 | 17 December 2013 | FDP |
| Federal Minister of Economics and Technology | Rainer Brüderle | 28 October 2009 | 12 May 2011 | FDP |
| Federal Minister of Economics and Technology | Philipp Rösler | 12 May 2011 | 17 December 2013 | FDP |
| Federal Minister of Labour and Social Affairs | Franz Josef Jung | 28 October 2009 | 27 November 2009 | CDU |
| Federal Minister of Labour and Social Affairs | Ursula von der Leyen | 30 November 2009 | 17 December 2013 | CDU |
| Federal Minister of Food, Agriculture and Consumer Protection | Ilse Aigner | 28 October 2009 | 30 September 2013 | CDU |
| Federal Minister of Food, Agriculture and Consumer Protection | Hans-Peter Friedrich (Acting) | 30 November 2009 | 17 December 2013 | CDU |
| Federal Minister of Transport, Building and Urban Affairs | Peter Ramsauer | 30 November 2009 | 17 December 2013 | CSU |
| Federal Minister for Family Affairs, Senior Citizens, Women and Youth | Ursula von der Leyen | 28 October 2009 | 30 November 2009 | CDU |
| Federal Minister for Family Affairs, Senior Citizens, Women and Youth | Kristina Schröder | 30 November 2009 | 17 December 2013 | CDU |
| Federal Minister of Health | Philipp Rösler | 28 October 2009 | 12 May 2011 | FDP |
| Federal Minister of Health | Daniel Bahr | 12 May 2011 | 17 December 2013 | FDP |
| Federal Minister of Education, Science and Technology | Annette Schavan | 28 October 2009 | 14 February 2013 | CDU |
| Federal Minister of Education, Science and Technology | Johanna Wanka | 14 February 2013 | 17 December 2013 | CDU |
| Federal Minister of Economic Cooperation | Dirk Niebel | 28 October 2009 | 17 December 2013 | FDP |
| Federal Minister of Environment, Nature Conservation, and Reactor Security | Norbert Röttgen | 28 October 2009 | 22 May 2012 | CDU |
| Federal Minister of Environment, Nature Conservation, and Reactor Security | Peter Altmaier | 22 May 2012 | 17 December 2013 | CDU |
| Federal Minister of Special Affairs & Head of the Chancellery | Ronald Pofalla | 28 October 2009 | 17 December 2013 | CDU |

== Resignations, dismissals and replacements ==
The second Merkel cabinet was reshuffled several times. The first change occurred on 30 November 2009, when Franz Josef Jung resigned as Labour Minister amidst controversy surrounding the Kunduz airstrike, which happened while he was Defense Minister in the previous cabinet. He was succeeded by former Family Affairs Minister Ursula von der Leyen, who was in turn succeeded by Kristina Schröder.

On 3 March 2011, Karl-Theodor zu Guttenberg stepped down as Defense Minister following the discovery of plagiarized content in his doctoral dissertation. He was succeeded by former Interior Minister Thomas de Maizière, who was in turn succeeded by Hans-Peter Friedrich.

On 10 May 2011, Rainer Brüderle was elected as the FDP's parliamentary leader and resigned his position as Economics Minister. He was succeeded by former Health Minister Philipp Rösler, who was in turn succeeded by Daniel Bahr. On 13 May 2011, the FDP elected Rösler to succeed Guido Westerwelle as party chairman. Rösler was then named Vice Chancellor on 16 May 2011, succeeding Westerwelle in this position as well. Westerwelle retained the position of Foreign Minister.

On 16 May 2012, Merkel requested that President Joachim Gauck dismiss Environment Minister Norbert Röttgen after the CDU's defeat in the North Rhine-Westphalia state election. Röttgen had been CDU chairman for that state. He was dismissed on 22 May 2012 and was succeeded as Environment Minister by Peter Altmaier.

On 5 February 2013, Annette Schavan was stripped of her doctorate by the University of Düsseldorf due to alleged plagiarism in her PhD thesis. She resigned on 9 February 2013 and was succeeded by Johanna Wanka.

== See also ==
- Cabinet of Germany
