= Andreas Blunck =

German politician

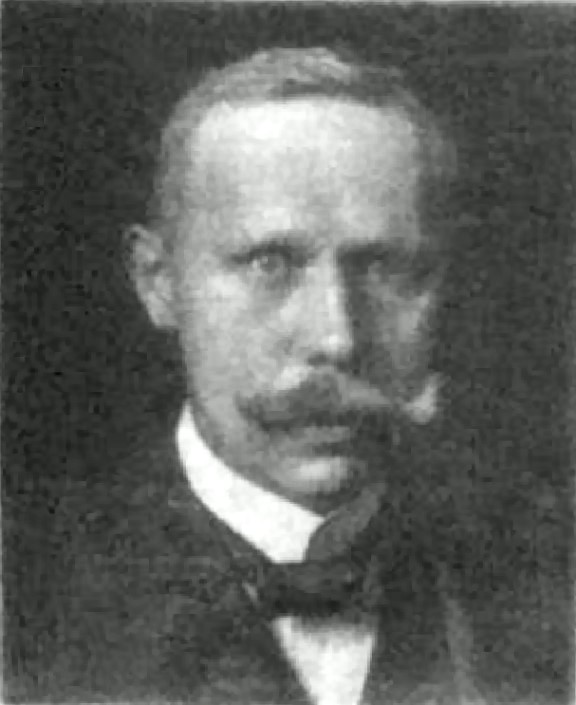
Andreas Blunck.

Max Andreas Blunck (20 December 1871 – 12 April 1933) was a German politician of the liberal German Democratic Party (DDP). He served as Minister of Justice in the government of Hermann Müller from March to June 1920.

== Biography ==
Blunck was born on 20 December 1871 in Krempe in the Prussian Province of Schleswig-Holstein.

After attending the Gymnasium in Glückstadt, Blunck studied law and the Chinese language in Berlin. In 1894, he started working as a public servant in Hamburg. After being awarded a Dr.jur. in Jena in 1898, he began working as a lawyer in Hamburg. From 1904 to 1918, Blunck was a member of the Hamburg Bürgerschaft (the local parliament) for a rural area.

In 1912, he was elected as the Reichstag delegate for the Tondern–Husum–Eiderstedt constituency for the Freisinnige Volkspartei.

In the German Revolution, he was arrested by the local radical Workers' council on 8 December 1918.

He was a DDP member of the Weimar National Assembly in 1919 to 1920 and a DDP member of the Reichstag from 1920 to 1924.

After the Kapp-Lüttwitz Putsch of March 1920, Blunck became justice minister in the government of Hermann Müller (SPD). The government resigned in June 1920 after the Reichstag elections.

He died in Aumühle on 12 April 1933.
