= Rudolf Arnold Nieberding =

German jurist and politician (1838–1912)

Secretary of Justice
- In office 10 July 1893 – 25 October 1909
- Chancellor: Leo von Caprivi; Chlodwig, Prince of Hohenlohe-Schillingsfürst; Bernhard von Bülow; Theobald von Bethmann Hollweg
- Preceded by: Eduard Hanauer
- Succeeded by: Hermann Lisco

Personal details
- Born: 4 May 1838 Konitz, West Prussia, Kingdom of Prussia
- Died: 10 October 1912 (aged 74) Berlin, German Empire
- Education: University of Breslau; University of Heidelberg; Humboldt University of Berlin
- Profession: Jurist

Rudolf Arnold Nieberding (4 May 1838 – 10 October 1912) was a German jurist and politician.

Nieberding was born in Konitz (modern Chojnice, Poland) to Karl Nieberding, a teacher and later director of the "Gymnasium Petrinum" in Recklinghausen.

He passed his Abitur in Recklinghausen and studied law at the Universities of Breslau (modern Wrocław), Heidelberg and Berlin. Nieberding finished his studies in 1863 and, after a short period at the regional administration of Breslau, started to work at the Prussian ministry of commerce in 1866. Between 1872 and 1889 he worked at the Reich Chancellery in Berlin and became head of the first département at the Reich office of the Interior in 1889.

In 1893 he was appointed Secretary of State of the Reichsjustizamt, and he remained in this position under the changing chancellorship of Leo von Caprivi, Chlodwig, Prince of Hohenlohe-Schillingsfürst, Bernhard von Bülow and Theobald von Bethmann Hollweg until 1909. Nieberding coordinated the elaboration of a new German civil code, the Bürgerliches Gesetzbuch (BGB), the associated Commercial law (Handelsgesetzbuch) and the codes of criminal law and criminal and civil procedure; thus he was responsible for the standardisation of German law after the Unification of Germany. In his opening speech to the parliamentary debate on the BGB in 1896 Nieberding described the legal situation in Germany as a "colorful muddle, .. for so long forgotten, citizens and families have determined their own legal relationships for themselves."

In a Reichstag debate on 23 November 1907 he publicly stated that the lèse-majesté laws of Imperial Germany resulted in a "growth of a base and hostile climate of denunciation" in which "even members of the same family, indeed the best of friends, denounce each other for lèse-majesté the minute discord between them occurs", and these laws were "not entirely reconcilable with the general sense of justice."

Nieberding retired in 1909 and died in Berlin.
