= Recklinghausen I =

Federal electoral district of Germany

120 Recklinghausen I
- Electoral district for the Bundestag
- Recklinghausen I in 2025
- State: North Rhine-Westphalia
- Population: 214,100 (2019)
- Electorate: 165,193 (2021)
- Major settlements: Recklinghausen; Castrop-Rauxel
- Area: 165.3 km^{2}

Current electoral district
- Created: 1949
- Party: SPD
- Member: Frank Schwabe
- Elected: 2005, 2009, 2013, 2017, 2021

Recklinghausen I is an electoral constituency (German: Wahlkreis) represented in the Bundestag. It elects one member via first-past-the-post voting. Under the current constituency numbering system, it is designated as constituency 120. It is located in the Ruhr region of North Rhine-Westphalia, comprising the southeastern part of the Recklinghausen district.

Recklinghausen I was created for the inaugural 1949 federal election. Since 2005, it has been represented by Frank Schwabe of the Social Democratic Party (SPD).

== Geography ==
Recklinghausen I is located in the Ruhr region of North Rhine-Westphalia. As of the 2021 federal election, it comprises the municipalities of Castrop-Rauxel, Recklinghausen, and Waltrop from the Recklinghausen district.

== History ==
Recklinghausen I was created in 1949, then known as Recklinghausen-Stadt. It acquired its current name in the 1980 West German federal election.

In the 1949 election, it was North Rhine-Westphalia constituency 42 in the numbering system. From 1953 through 1961, it was number 101. From 1965 through 1976, it was number 100. From 1980 through 1998, it was number 91. From 2002 through 2009, it was number 122. In the 2013 through 2021 elections, it was number 121. From the 2025 election, it has been number 120.

Originally, the constituency comprised only the city of Recklinghausen. From 1965 through 1976, it comprised the independent city of Recklinghausen and the municipalities of Waltrop, Henrichenburg, Datteln, Oer-Erkenschwick, and Haltern from the Recklinghausen district. It acquired its current borders in the 1980 election.

Election	No.	Name	Borders
1949	42	Recklinghausen-Stadt	Recklinghausen city
1953	101	Recklinghausen-Stadt	Recklinghausen city
1957	101	Recklinghausen-Stadt	Recklinghausen city
1961	101	Recklinghausen-Stadt	Recklinghausen city
1965	100	Recklinghausen-Stadt	Recklinghausen city; Recklinghausen district (only Waltrop, Henrichenburg, Datteln, Oer-Erkenschwick, and Haltern municipalities)
1969	100	Recklinghausen-Stadt	Recklinghausen city; Recklinghausen district (only Waltrop, Henrichenburg, Datteln, Oer-Erkenschwick, and Haltern municipalities)
1972	100	Recklinghausen-Stadt	Recklinghausen city; Recklinghausen district (only Waltrop, Henrichenburg, Datteln, Oer-Erkenschwick, and Haltern municipalities)
1976	100	Recklinghausen-Stadt	Recklinghausen city; Recklinghausen district (only Waltrop, Henrichenburg, Datteln, Oer-Erkenschwick, and Haltern municipalities)
1980	91	Recklinghausen I	Recklinghausen district (only Castrop-Rauxel, Recklinghausen, and Waltrop municipalities)
1983	91	Recklinghausen I	Recklinghausen district (only Castrop-Rauxel, Recklinghausen, and Waltrop municipalities)
1987	91	Recklinghausen I	Recklinghausen district (only Castrop-Rauxel, Recklinghausen, and Waltrop municipalities)
1990	91	Recklinghausen I	Recklinghausen district (only Castrop-Rauxel, Recklinghausen, and Waltrop municipalities)
1994	91	Recklinghausen I	Recklinghausen district (only Castrop-Rauxel, Recklinghausen, and Waltrop municipalities)
1998	91	Recklinghausen I	Recklinghausen district (only Castrop-Rauxel, Recklinghausen, and Waltrop municipalities)
2002	122	Recklinghausen I	Recklinghausen district (only Castrop-Rauxel, Recklinghausen, and Waltrop municipalities)
2005	122	Recklinghausen I	Recklinghausen district (only Castrop-Rauxel, Recklinghausen, and Waltrop municipalities)
2009	122	Recklinghausen I	Recklinghausen district (only Castrop-Rauxel, Recklinghausen, and Waltrop municipalities)
2013	121	Recklinghausen I	Recklinghausen district (only Castrop-Rauxel, Recklinghausen, and Waltrop municipalities)
2017	121	Recklinghausen I	Recklinghausen district (only Castrop-Rauxel, Recklinghausen, and Waltrop municipalities)
2021	121	Recklinghausen I	Recklinghausen district (only Castrop-Rauxel, Recklinghausen, and Waltrop municipalities)
2025	120	Recklinghausen I	Recklinghausen district (only Castrop-Rauxel, Recklinghausen, and Waltrop municipalities)

== Members ==
The constituency has been held by the Social Democratic Party (SPD) during all but three Bundestag terms since 1949. It was first represented by Bernhard Winkelheide of the Christian Democratic Union (CDU) from 1949 to 1961. Heinrich Auge of the SPD was elected in 1961 and served two terms, followed by Erich Wolfram from 1969 to 1987. Heinz-Werner Meyer served a single term from 1987 to 1990. He was succeeded by Jochen Welt from 1990 to 2005. Frank Schwabe was elected in 2005, and re-elected in 2009, 2013, 2017, 2021 and 2025.

Election	Member	Party	%
1949	Bernhard Winkelheide	CDU	48.3
1953	Bernhard Winkelheide	CDU	49.4
1957	Bernhard Winkelheide	CDU	50.5
1961	Heinrich Auge	SPD	44.3
1965	Heinrich Auge	SPD	51.1
1969	Erich Wolfram	SPD	53.5
1972	Erich Wolfram	SPD	59.7
1976	Erich Wolfram	SPD	56.1
1980	Erich Wolfram	SPD	57.5
1983	Erich Wolfram	SPD	53.9
1987	Heinz-Werner Meyer	SPD	53.9
1990	Jochen Welt	SPD	52.4
1994	Jochen Welt	SPD	54.8
1998	Jochen Welt	SPD	58.8
2002	Jochen Welt	SPD	56.2
2005	Frank Schwabe	SPD	55.7
2009	Frank Schwabe	SPD	43.1
2013	Frank Schwabe	SPD	45.2
2017	Frank Schwabe	SPD	38.7
2021	Frank Schwabe	SPD	41.0
2025	Frank Schwabe	SPD	33.1

== Election results ==
=== 2025 election ===
Federal election (2021): Recklinghausen I
Notes:	Blue background denotes the winner of the electorate vote. Pink background denotes a candidate elected from their party list. Yellow background denotes an electorate win by a list member, or other incumbent. A ✓ or ✗ denotes status of any incumbent, win or lose respectively.						
Party	Candidate	Votes	%	±%	Party votes	%	±%
SPD	✓ Frank Schwabe	42,356	33.1	▼7.9	29,886	23.3	▼12.0
CDU	Michael Breilmann	36,875	28.8	▲3.2	35,131	27.4	▲4.2
AfD	Anna Rathert	25,912	20.2	▲11.0	25,875	20.2	▲11.1
Greens	Regina Weyer	8,686	6.8	▼3.9	12,446	9.7	▼2.9
Left	Erich Burmeister	7,544	5.9	▲2.9	9,622	7.5	▲4.0
BSW					5,656	4.4	
FDP	Mathias Richter	3,278	2.6	▼4.5	4,581	3.6	▼6.4
PARTEI	Emily Böker	2,074	1.6	▼0.6	875	0.7	▼0.6
Tierschutzpartei					1,945	1.5	▼0.1
FW	Andreas Grün	1,096	0.9		559	0.4	▼0.1
Volt					617	0.	▲0.3
Team Todenhöfer					275	0.2	▼0.5
dieBasis	Marcus Puller			▼1.1	260	0.2	▼0.6
MLPD	Alexander-Renee Schroeter	222	0.2	▲0.1	80	0.1	0.0
PdF					208	0.2	▲0.1
BD					170	0.1	
Values					70	0.1	
MERA25					55	0.0	
Pirates							▼0.4
Gesundheitsforschung							▼0.1
Humanists						.	▼0.1
Bündnis C							▼0.1
ÖDP						0.0	0.0
SGP						0.0	0.0
Informal votes		991			723		
Total valid votes		128,043			128,311		
Turnout		129,034	79.8	▲6.2			
SPD hold	Majority	5,481	4.3				

=== 2021 election ===
Federal election (2021): Recklinghausen I
Notes:	Blue background denotes the winner of the electorate vote. Pink background denotes a candidate elected from their party list. Yellow background denotes an electorate win by a list member, or other incumbent. A ✓ or ✗ denotes status of any incumbent, win or lose respectively.						
Party	Candidate	Votes	%	±%	Party votes	%	±%
SPD	✓ Frank Schwabe	49,437	41.0	▲2.4	42,552	35.2	▲3.7
CDU	Michael Breilmann	30,845	25.6	▼5.3	27,988	23.2	▼5.4
Greens	Nils Stennei	12,833	10.6	▲5.7	15,180	12.6	▲6.8
AfD	Lutz Wagner	11,087	9.2	▼2.2	10,927	9.1	▼3.0
FDP	Marlies Greve	8,481	7.0	▼0.2	11,989	9.9	▼0.4
Left	Uwe Biletzke	3,605	3.0	▼3.6	4,239	3.5	▼3.8
Tierschutzpartei					1,961	1.6	▲0.8
PARTEI	Carsten Majewski	2,722	2.3		1,526	1.3	▲0.3
dieBasis	Marcus Puller	1,282	1.1		966	0.8	
Team Todenhöfer					913	0.8	
FW					594	0.5	▲0.2
Pirates					473	0.4	0.0
Volt					242	0.2	
LIEBE					170	0.1	
Gesundheitsforschung					164	0.1	0.0
NPD					152	0.1	▼0.2
LfK					140	0.1	
MLPD	Klaus Dumberger	128	0.1	▼0.2	87	0.1	▼0.1
V-Partei3					80	0.1	0.0
Humanists					72	0.1	0.0
Bündnis C					69	0.1	
du.					62	0.1	
ÖDP					60	0.0	0.0
PdF					42	0.0	
DKP	Werner Sarbok	99	0.1		40	0.0	0.0
LKR					33	0.0	
SGP					16	0.0	0.0
Informal votes		1,121			903		
Total valid votes		120,519			120,737		
Turnout		121,640	73.6	▲0.4			
SPD hold	Majority	18,592	15.4	▲7.7			

=== 2017 election ===
Federal election (2017): Recklinghausen I
Notes:	Blue background denotes the winner of the electorate vote. Pink background denotes a candidate elected from their party list. Yellow background denotes an electorate win by a list member, or other incumbent. A ✓ or ✗ denotes status of any incumbent, win or lose respectively.						
Party	Candidate	Votes	%	±%	Party votes	%	±%
SPD	✓ Frank Schwabe	47,257	38.7	▼6.6	38,822	31.6	▼8.2
CDU	Michael Breilmann	37,792	30.9	▼3.4	35,108	28.6	▼5.3
AfD	Steffen Michel Sigmar Christ	13,953	11.4	▲8.2	14,777	12.0	▲7.5
FDP	Anne Krüger	8,791	7.2	▲5.2	12,674	10.3	▲6.9
Left	Erich Karl Burmeister	8,043	6.6	▲0.4	8,970	7.3	▲0.5
Greens	Jan Matzoll	6,079	5.0	▼0.2	7,132	5.8	▼0.6
PARTEI					1,163	0.9	▲0.6
Tierschutzpartei					1,060	0.9	
AD-DEMOKRATEN					892	0.7	
Pirates					540	0.4	▼1.8
NPD					362	0.3	▼1.0
FW					320	0.3	▲0.1
MLPD	Yvonne Adamski	327	0.3		168	0.1	▲0.1
Volksabstimmung					138	0.1	▼0.1
Gesundheitsforschung					134	0.1	
V-Partei³					125	0.1	
DiB					124	0.1	
DM					109	0.1	
BGE					100	0.1	
ÖDP					78	0.1	▼0.1
Die Humanisten					66	0.1	
DKP					14	0.0	
SGP					8	0.0	0.0
Informal votes		1,716			1,074		
Total valid votes		122,242			122,884		
Turnout		123,958	73.2	▲2.2			
SPD hold	Majority	9,465	7.8	▼3.1			

=== 2013 election ===
Federal election (2013): Recklinghausen I
Notes:	Blue background denotes the winner of the electorate vote. Pink background denotes a candidate elected from their party list. Yellow background denotes an electorate win by a list member, or other incumbent. A ✓ or ✗ denotes status of any incumbent, win or lose respectively.						
Party	Candidate	Votes	%	±%	Party votes	%	±%
SPD	✓ Frank Schwabe	54,504	45.2	▲2.1	48,070	39.8	▲4.2
CDU	Philipp Mißfelder	41,383	34.3	▲3.6	40,898	33.8	▲5.5
Left	Erich Burmeister	7,410	6.1	▼4.3	8,244	6.8	▼4.8
Greens	Sebastian Ohler	6,178	5.1	▼1.3	7,716	6.4	▼1.8
AfD	Ulrich Wolinski	3,921	3.3		5,464	4.5	
Pirates	Thomas Weijers	2,953	2.4		2,661	2.2	▲0.4
FDP	Mathias Richter	2,426	2.0	▼5.4	4,100	3.4	▼7.6
NPD	Werner Goedeke	1,770	1.5	▼0.2	1,530	1.3	▲0.1
PARTEI					410	0.3	
PRO					402	0.3	
Volksabstimmung					217	0.2	▲0.1
REP					204	0.2	▼0.2
FW					185	0.2	
Nichtwahler					163	0.1	
BIG					162	0.1	
ÖDP					152	0.1	▲0.1
MLPD					86	0.1	0.0
RRP					85	0.1	▼0.1
Party of Reason					79	0.1	
Die Rechte					41	0.0	
PSG					37	0.0	0.0
BüSo					21	0.0	0.0
Informal votes		1,801			1,419		
Total valid votes		120,545			120,927		
Turnout		122,346	71.1	▲0.1			
SPD hold	Majority	13,121	10.9	▼1.5			

=== 2009 election ===
Federal election (2009): Recklinghausen I
Notes:	Blue background denotes the winner of the electorate vote. Pink background denotes a candidate elected from their party list. Yellow background denotes an electorate win by a list member, or other incumbent. A ✓ or ✗ denotes status of any incumbent, win or lose respectively.						
Party	Candidate	Votes	%	±%	Party votes	%	±%
SPD	✓ Frank Schwabe	52,627	43.1	▼12.6	43,571	35.5	▼15.2
CDU	Philipp Mißfelder	37,504	30.7	▼0.3	34,732	28.3	▼0.1
Left	Erich Burmeister	12,781	10.5	▲5.0	14,202	11.6	▲5.3
FDP	Michael Postel	9,090	7.4	▲3.8	13,462	11.0	▲4.8
Greens	Monya Schnittke	7,846	6.4	▲3.4	9,984	8.1	▲2.5
Pirates					2,162	1.8	
NPD	Marion Reinert	2,078	1.7	▲0.5	1,470	1.2	▲0.3
Tierschutzpartei					852	0.7	▲0.2
FAMILIE					599	0.5	▲0.1
RENTNER					463	0.4	
REP					410	0.3	0.0
Independent	Herold Albert Schincke	264	0.2				
RRP					202	0.2	
DVU					182	0.1	
Volksabstimmung					102	0.1	0.0
ÖDP					82	0.1	
MLPD					80	0.1	0.0
Centre					56	0.0	0.0
BüSo					30	0.0	0.0
PSG					17	0.0	0.0
Informal votes		1,847			1,379		
Total valid votes		122,190			122,658		
Turnout		124,037	71.0	▼5.2			
SPD hold	Majority	15,123	12.4	▼12.3			

=== 2005 election ===
Federal election (2005): Recklinghausen I
Notes:	Blue background denotes the winner of the electorate vote. Pink background denotes a candidate elected from their party list. Yellow background denotes an electorate win by a list member, or other incumbent. A ✓ or ✗ denotes status of any incumbent, win or lose respectively.						
Party	Candidate	Votes	%	±%	Party votes	%	±%
SPD	Frank Schwabe	74,750	55.7	▼0.5	68,262	50.7	▼2.4
CDU	Philipp Mißfelder	41,620	31.0	▲0.4	38,227	28.4	▲0.4
Left	Wolfgang Straub	7,285	5.4	▲4.2	8,411	6.3	▲5.1
FDP	Peter Faßbach	4,859	3.6	▼1.6	8,276	6.2	▼1.2
Greens	Ali Toprak	4,094	3.1	▼2.0	7,621	5.7	▼1.8
NPD	Benjamin Dahlbeck	1,612	1.2		1,224	0.9	▲0.6
Tierschutzpartei					605	0.4	▲0.1
Familie					529	0.4	▲0.1
REP					488	0.4	
GRAUEN					449	0.3	▲0.1
From Now on... Democracy Through Referendum					127	0.1	
MLPD					120	0.1	
PBC					97	0.0	
Socialist Equality Party					65	0.0	
BüSo					38	0.0	
Centre					30	0.0	0.0
Informal votes		1,992			1,643		
Total valid votes		134,220			134,569		
Turnout		136,212	77.2	▼1.7			
SPD hold	Majority	33,130	24.7				
