= Paul von Krause =

German jurist and politician (1852–1923)

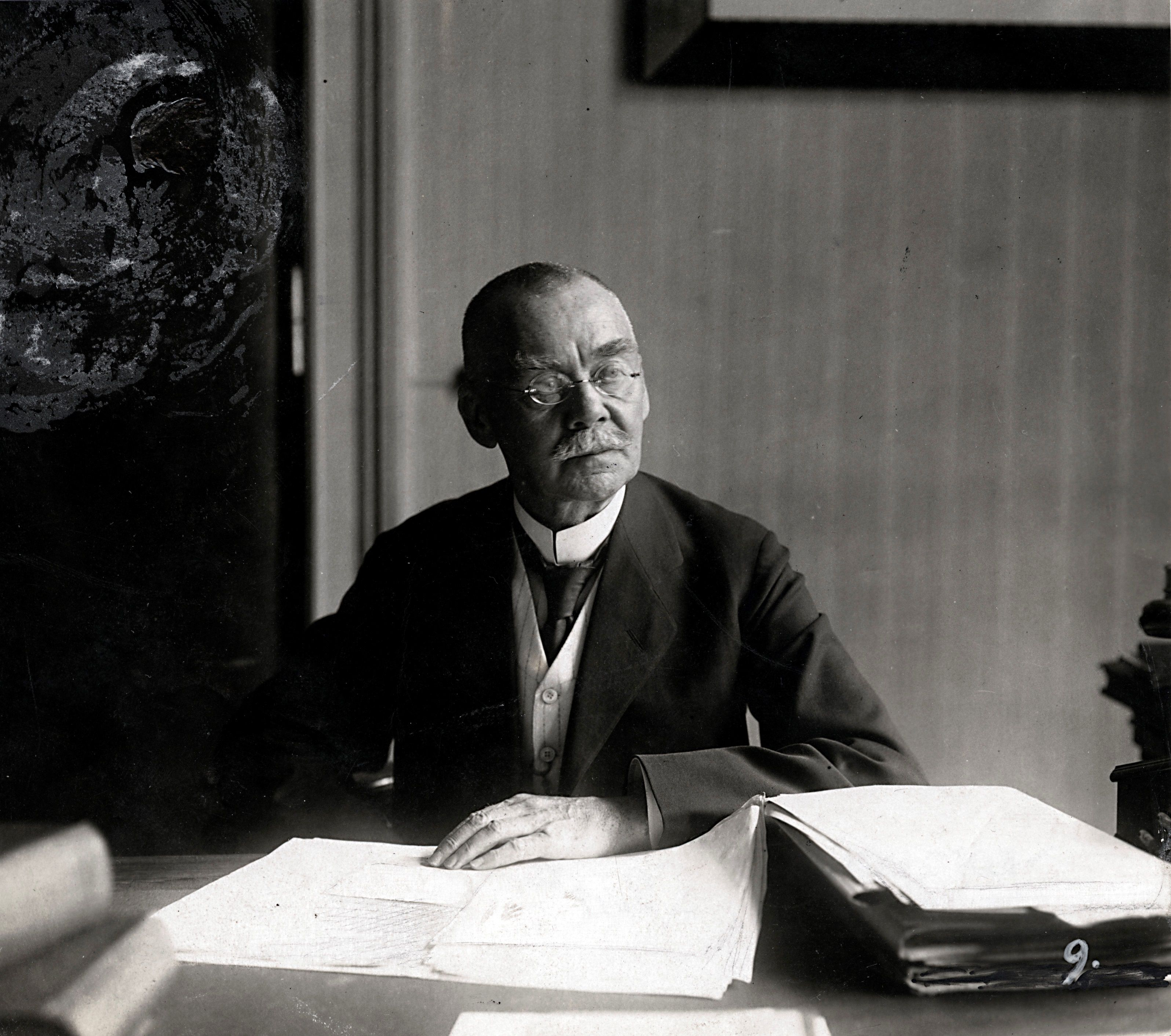

Member of the Prussian Parliament
- In office 1889–1917
- In office 1921–1923
- Constituency: Königsberg-Fischhausen

Vice President of the Prussian Parliament
- In office 1896–1917

Secretary of Justice
- In office 7 August 1917 – 13 February 1919
- Chancellor: Georg Michaelis; Georg von Hertling; Max von Baden
- Preceded by: Hermann Lisco
- Succeeded by: Otto Landsberg

Member of the Prussian Constitutional Assembly
- In office 1919–1921

Personal details
- Born: 4 April 1852 Karbowo, West Prussia, Kingdom of Prussia
- Died: 17 December 1923 (aged 71) Berlin, Weimar Germany
- Party: National Liberal; Deutsche Volkspartei
- Education: University of Leipzig; University of Heidelberg; Humboldt University of Berlin
- Profession: lawyer

Paul George Christoph von Krause (4 April 1852 – 17 December 1923) was a German jurist and politician.

== Biography ==
Paul von Krause was born Paul Krause in Karbowo (near Brodnica), West Prussia (modern Poland), he was ennobled ("von Krause") in 1913.

Krause studied law at the Universities of Leipzig, Heidelberg and Berlin and passed his doctorate in 1877 at the University of Göttingen. Since 1880 he worked as a lawyer, since 1887 also as a Notary, in Königsberg and Berlin.

From 1902 to 1909 Krause was a member of the board of the German bar association and Chairman of the Berlin bar association from 1905 to 1917. He was elected as a National Liberal member of the Prussian Parliament (Abgeordnetenhaus), representing the constituency of Königsberg-Fischhausen, in 1888 and became its Vice-President in 1896.

Krause was the Chairman of the German Association of inland navigation in 1904-1906 and became State Secretary of the Reichsjustizamt on 7 August 1917. He remained in this position throughout the German November Revolution and was replaced by Otto Landsberg on 13 February 1919.

Krause became a member of the Prussian Constitutional Assembly ("Preußische Landesversammlung") in 1919 and the Prussian Landtag in 1921, representing the Deutsche Volkspartei.

Krause died in Berlin, where a street ("Paul-Krause-Strasse") is named after him.
