= Karbowo, Kuyavian-Pomeranian Voivodeship =

Karbowo
- Village
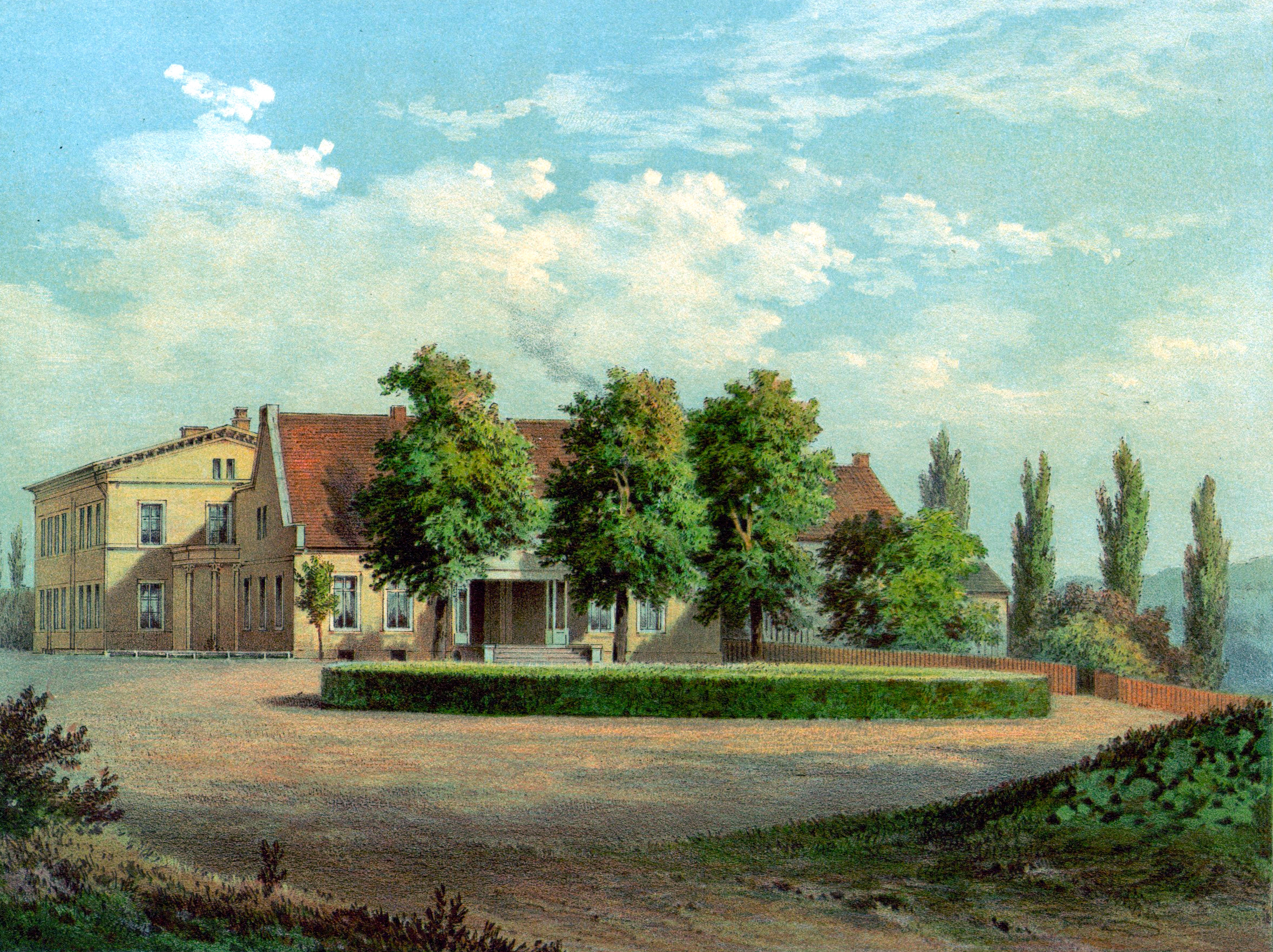
- Karbowo (Karben) in 1857 by Alexander Duncker

- Location within Poland
- Coordinates: 53°17′14″N 19°24′44″E
- Country: Poland
- Voivodeship: Kuyavian-Pomeranian
- County: Brodnica
- Gmina: Gmina Brodnica

Karbowo [karˈbɔvɔ] is a village in the administrative district of Gmina Brodnica, within Brodnica County, Kuyavian-Pomeranian Voivodeship, in north-central Poland.

== Notable residents ==
- Paul von Krause (1852- 1923), politician
