= Federal Ministry of Justice and Consumer Protection =

Federal ministry of the Federal Republic of Germany

Federal Ministry of Justice and Consumer Protection (BMJV)
- Bundesministerium der Justiz und für Verbraucherschutz
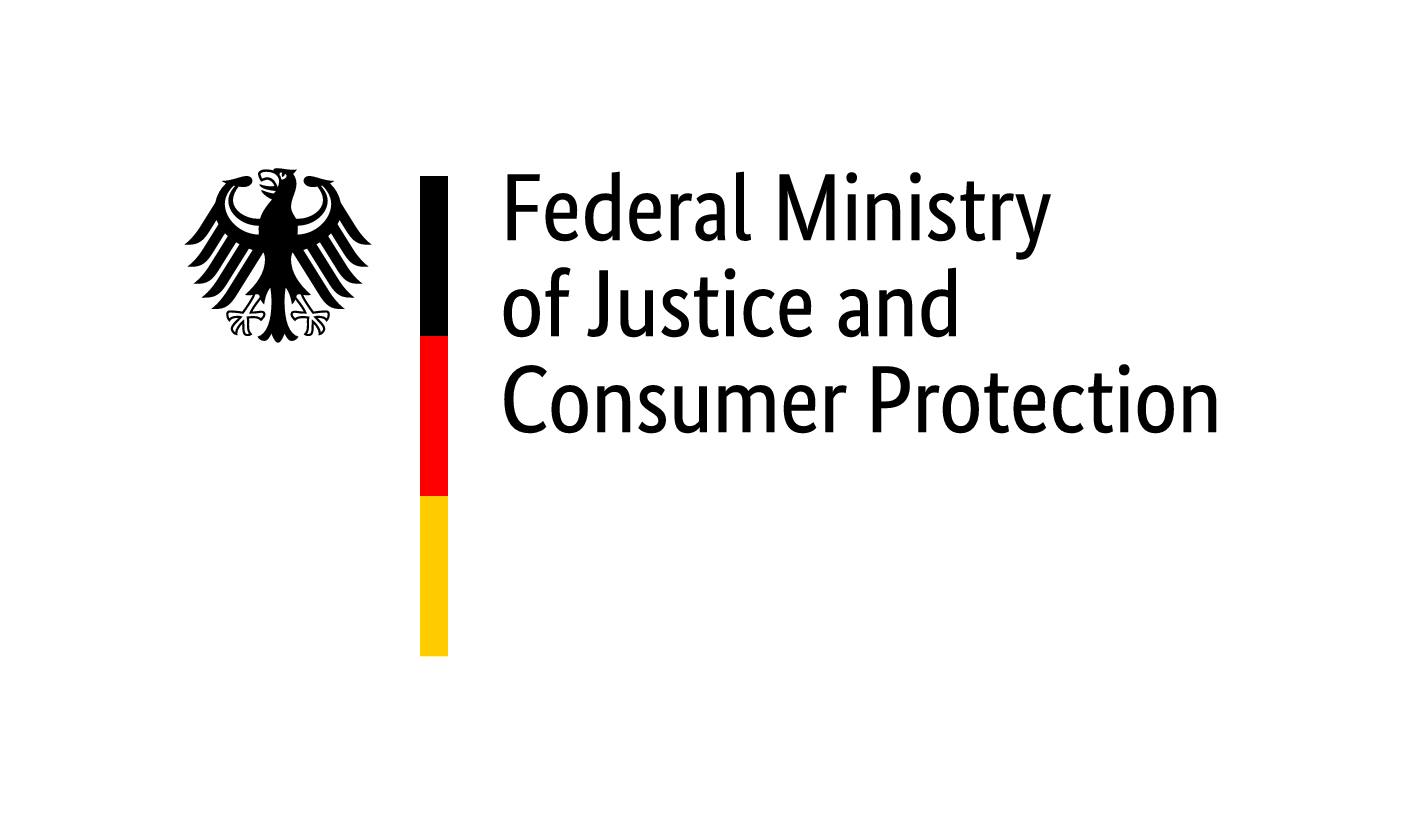

Agency overview
- Formed: 1 January 1877 as Reichsjustizamt
- Jurisdiction: Government of Germany
- Headquarters: Berlin, Germany; 52.51201°N 13.39587°E
- Employees: 676 (2026)
- Annual budget: €1.213 billion (2026)
- Minister responsible: Stefanie Hubig, Federal Minister of Justice and Consumer Protection
- Agency executives: Annette Kramme, Parliamentary Secretary of State; Frank Schwabe, Permanent Secretary of State
- Website: www.bmjv.de/EN/home/home_node.html

The Federal Ministry of Justice and Consumer Protection (German: Bundesministerium der Justiz und für Verbraucherschutz; abbreviated BMJV) is a cabinet-level ministry of the Federal Republic of Germany. Under the German federal system, individual States are most responsible for the administration of justice and the application of penalties. The Federal Ministry of Justice devotes itself to creating and changing law in the classic core areas related to Constitutional law. The Ministry also analyzes the legality and constitutionality of laws prepared by other ministries. The German Federal Court of Justice, the German Patent and Trade Mark Office (GPTO), and the German Patent Court all fall under its scope, including affairs on court administration. The ministry is officially located in Berlin.

The BMJ was founded on 1 January 1877 as the Imperial Justice Office (Reichsjustizamt). After Germany became a republic in 1919, it was renamed Reichsministerium der Justiz (Imperial ministry of Justice). The ministry was refounded as the Bundesministerium der Justiz in 1949. In several laws predating 1949, the ministry and the minister are however referred to as Reichsministerium der Justiz and Reichsminister der Justiz, respectively. This has gradually been replaced with the new name and title when laws have been amended, most recently in 2010.

== Competencies ==
In Germany's federal system, the administration of justice, the judiciary and law enforcement are primarily the responsibility of the Länder. The central task of the Federation in the field of justice is to safeguard and develop the rule of law. Legislative activity corresponds to this objective. It includes the preparation of new laws and the preparation and amendment or repeal of laws in the classical areas of law, namely civil law, criminal law, commercial and company law, copyright and industrial property law, court constitutional and procedural law for the individual jurisdictions (with the exception of labour and social courts), as well as service and professional law for judges, public prosecutors, lawyers and notaries. In addition, the Ministry is responsible for the tasks arising from the establishment of German unity in the areas of criminal, administrative and professional rehabilitation and "open property issues". The Ministry also examines the legal form of all draft laws and regulations prepared by other ministries in order to ensure that the legislation is compatible with the Basic Law.

The Ministry's portfolio includes the Federal Court of Justice in Karlsruhe with two criminal divisions in Leipzig, the Federal Public Prosecutor's Office at the Federal Court of Justice in Karlsruhe with an office in Leipzig, the Federal Office of Justice with the Federal Central Register in Bonn, the Federal Administrative Court in Leipzig, the Federal Fiscal Court in Munich, the Federal Patent Court in Munich and the German Patent and Trade Mark Office (DPMA) in Munich with offices in Berlin and Jena.

== List of ministers ==
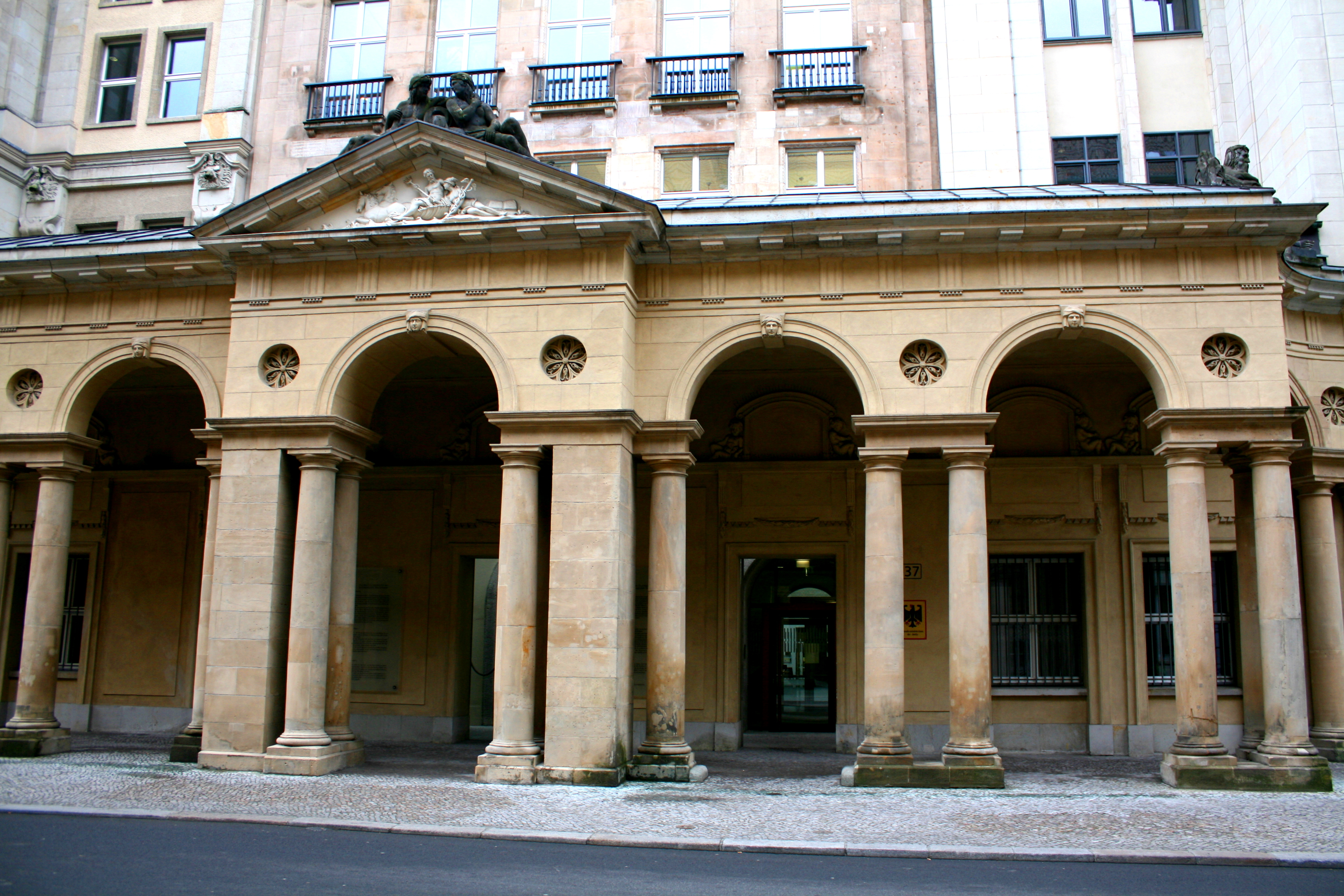
The Federal Ministry of Justice in Berlin

=== State Secretaries for Justice, 1876–1919 ===
- Heinrich Friedberg 1876–1879
- Hermann von Schelling 1879–1889
- Otto von Oehlschläger 1889–1891
- Robert Bosse 1891–1892
- Eduard von Hanauer 1892–1893
- Rudolf Arnold Nieberding 1893–1909
- Hermann Lisco 1909–1917
- Paul Georg Christof von Krause 1917–1919

=== Ministers of Justice, 1919–1945 ===
No.	Portrait	Name (Born-Died)	Term			Political Party	Government
No.	Portrait	Name (Born-Died)	Took office	Left office	Time in office	Political Party	Government
1	Otto Landsberg	Otto Landsberg (1869–1957)	13 February 1919	20 June 1919	127 days	SPD	Scheidemann
2	Eugen Schiffer	Eugen Schiffer (1860–1954)	3 October 1919	26 March 1920	175 days	DDP	Bauer
3	Andreas Blunck	Andreas Blunck (1871–1933)	26 March 1920	8 June 1920	74 days	DDP	Müller I
4	Rudolf Heinze	Rudolf Heinze (1865–1928)	25 June 1920	4 May 1921	313 days	DVP	Fehrenbach
5 (2)	Eugen Schiffer	Eugen Schiffer (1860–1954)	10 May 1921	22 October 1921	165 days	DDP	Wirth I
6	Gustav Radbruch	Gustav Radbruch (1878–1949)	26 October 1921	14 November 1922	1 year, 19 days	SPD	Wirth II
7 (4)	Rudolf Heinze	Rudolf Heinze (1865–1928)	22 November 1922	12 August 1923	263 days	DVP	Cuno
8 (6)	Gustav Radbruch	Gustav Radbruch (1878–1949)	13 August 1923	3 November 1923	82 days	SPD	Stresemann I–II
9	Erich Emminger	Erich Emminger (1880–1951)	30 November 1923	15 April 1924	137 days	BVP	Marx I
–	Kurt Joël	Kurt Joël (1865–1945); Acting	15 April 1924	15 December 1924	244 days	Independent	Marx I–II
7	Josef Frenken	Josef Frenken (1854–1943)	15 January 1925	21 November 1925	341 days	Centre	Luther I
–	Hans Luther	Hans Luther (1879–1962); Acting	21 November 1925	5 December 1925	349 days	Independent	Luther I
8	Wilhelm Marx	Wilhelm Marx (1863–1946)	20 January 1926	12 May 1926	112 days	Centre	Luther II; Marx III
9	Johannes Bell	Johannes Bell (1868–1949)	16 May 1926	17 December 1926	215 days	Centre	Marx III
10	Oskar Hergt	Oskar Hergt (1869–1967)	28 January 1927	12 June 1928	1 year, 136 days	DNVP	Marx III–IV
11	Erich Koch-Weser	Erich Koch-Weser (1875–1944)	28 June 1928	13 April 1929	289 days	DDP	Müller II
12	Theodor von Guérard	Theodor von Guérard (1863–1943)	13 April 1929	27 March 1930	348 days	Centre	Müller II
13	Johann Viktor Bredt	Johann Viktor Bredt (1879–1940)	30 March 1930	5 December 1930	250 days	WP	Brüning I
14	Kurt Joël	Kurt Joël (1865–1945)	5 December 1930	30 May 1932	1 year, 177 days	Independent	Brüning I–II
15	Franz Gürtner	Franz Gürtner (1881–1941)	1 June 1932	29 January 1941 †	8 years, 242 days	DNVP; NSDAP	Papen; Schleicher; Hitler
16	Franz Schlegelberger	Franz Schlegelberger (1876–1970)	30 January 1941	20 August 1942	1 year, 202 days	NSDAP	Hitler
17	Otto Georg Thierack	Otto Georg Thierack (1889–1946)	20 August 1942	5 May 1945	2 years, 258 days	NSDAP	Hitler; Goebbels
–	Herbert Klemm	Herbert Klemm (1903–1963); Acting	5 May 1945	23 May 1945	18 days	NSDAP	Schwerin von Krosigk

=== Federal Ministers, since 1949 ===
Political Party: FDP DP CSU CDU SPD Independent

Name (Born-Died)		Portrait	Party	Term of Office		Chancellor (Cabinet)
Federal Minister of Justice (1949–2013, 2021–present) Federal Minister of Justice and Consumer Protection (2013–2021)
1	Thomas Dehler (1897–1967)		FDP	20 September 1949	20 October 1953	Adenauer (I)
2	Fritz Neumayer (1884–1973)		FDP	20 October 1953	16 October 1956	Adenauer (II)
3	Hans-Joachim von Merkatz (1905–1982)		DP	16 October 1956	29 October 1957	Adenauer (II)
4	Fritz Schäffer (1888–1967)		CSU	29 October 1957	14 November 1961	Adenauer (III)
5	Wolfgang Stammberger (1920–1982)		FDP	14 November 1961	19 November 1962	Adenauer (IV)
6	Ewald Bucher (1914–1991)		FDP	14 December 1962	27 March 1965	Adenauer (V); Erhard (I)
7	Karl Weber (1898–1985)		CDU	1 April 1965	26 October 1965	Erhard (I)
8	Richard Jaeger (1913–1998)		CSU	26 October 1965	30 November 1966	Erhard (II)
9	Gustav Heinemann (1899–1976)		SPD	1 December 1966	26 March 1969	Kiesinger (I)
10	Horst Ehmke (1927–2017)		SPD	26 March 1969	21 October 1969	Kiesinger (I)
11	Gerhard Jahn (1927–1998)		SPD	22 October 1969	7 May 1974	Brandt (I • II)
12	Hans-Jochen Vogel (1926–2020)		SPD	16 May 1974	22 January 1981	Schmidt (I • II • III)
13	Jürgen Schmude (1936–2025)		SPD	22 January 1981	1 October 1982	Schmidt (III)
14	Hans A. Engelhard (1934–2008)		FDP	4 October 1982	18 January 1991	Kohl (I • II • III)
15	Klaus Kinkel (1936–2019)		No party; FDP (from 1991)	18 January 1991	18 May 1992	Kohl (IV)
16	Sabine Leutheusser-Schnarrenberger (b. 1951)		FDP	18 May 1992	17 January 1996	Kohl (IV • V)
17	Edzard Schmidt-Jortzig (b. 1941)		FDP	17 January 1996	26 October 1998	Kohl (V)
18	Herta Däubler-Gmelin (b. 1943)		SPD	27 October 1998	22 October 2002	Schröder (I)
19	Brigitte Zypries (b. 1953)		SPD	22 October 2002	28 October 2009	Schröder (II); Merkel (I)
20 (16)	Sabine Leutheusser-Schnarrenberger (b. 1951)		FDP	28 October 2009	17 December 2013	Merkel (II)
21	Heiko Maas (b. 1966)		SPD	17 December 2013	14 March 2018	Merkel (III)
22	Katarina Barley (b. 1968)		SPD	14 March 2018	27 June 2019	Merkel (IV)
23	Christine Lambrecht (b. 1965)		SPD	27 June 2019	8 December 2021	Merkel (IV)
24	Marco Buschmann (b. 1977)		FDP	8 December 2021	7 November 2024	Scholz (I)
25	Volker Wissing (b. 1970)		Independent	7 November 2024	6 May 2025	Scholz (I)
26	Stefanie Hubig (b. 1968)		SPD	6 May 2025	Incumbent	Merz (I)
