= First Müller cabinet =

1920 cabinet of Weimar Germany

First Cabinet of Hermann Müller
- 3rd Cabinet of Weimar Germany
- 27 March 1920 – 8 June 1920 (until 21 June 1920 as caretaker government)
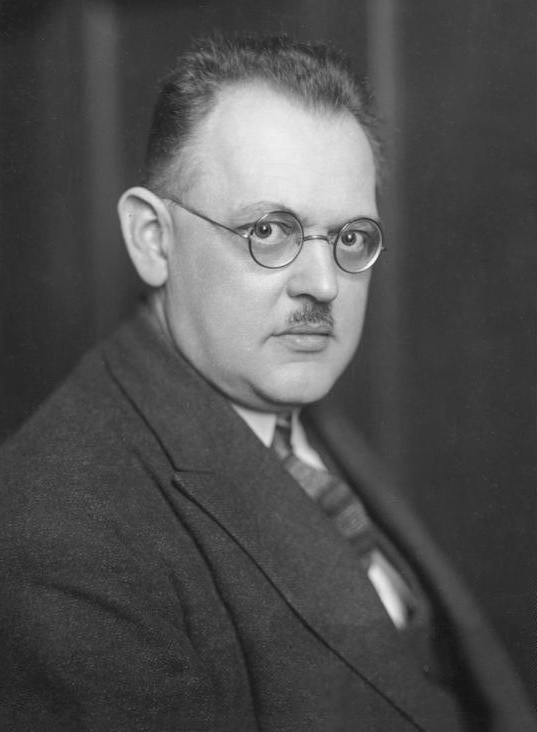
- Hermann Müller, Chancellor of Germany
- Date formed: 27 March 1920
- Date dissolved: 21 June 1920 (2 months and 25 days)

People and organisations
- President: Friedrich Ebert
- Chancellor: Hermann Müller
- Vice-Chancellor: Erich Koch-Weser
- Member parties: Social Democratic Party; Centre Party; German Democratic Party
- Status in legislature: Coalition
- Opposition parties: German National People's Party; Independent Social Democratic Party; German People's Party

History
- Election: 1919 federal election
- Legislature term: Weimar National Assembly
- Predecessor: Bauer cabinet
- Successor: Fehrenbach cabinet

The first Müller cabinet, headed by Chancellor Hermann Müller of the Social Democratic Party of Germany (SPD), was the third democratically elected government of Germany and the second in office after the Weimar Constitution came into force in August 1919. The cabinet was based on the same three centre-left parties as the preceding Bauer cabinet: the SPD, Centre Party and German Democratic Party (DDP), a grouping known as the Weimar Coalition. It was formed on 27 March 1920 after the government of Gustav Bauer (SPD) resigned as a result of the unsuccessful Kapp Putsch, which it was seen as having handled badly.

The Ruhr uprising, which broke out in the aftermath of the putsch, took place during the cabinet's time in office. It was suppressed with considerable loss of life by units of the Reichswehr and the Freikorps.

The first Müller cabinet resigned in reaction to the poor showing of its constituent parties in the Reichstag election of 6 June 1920 but remained in office through 21 June in a caretaker capacity. The Fehrenbach cabinet, headed by the Centre Party, took over on 25 June.

== Election and establishment ==
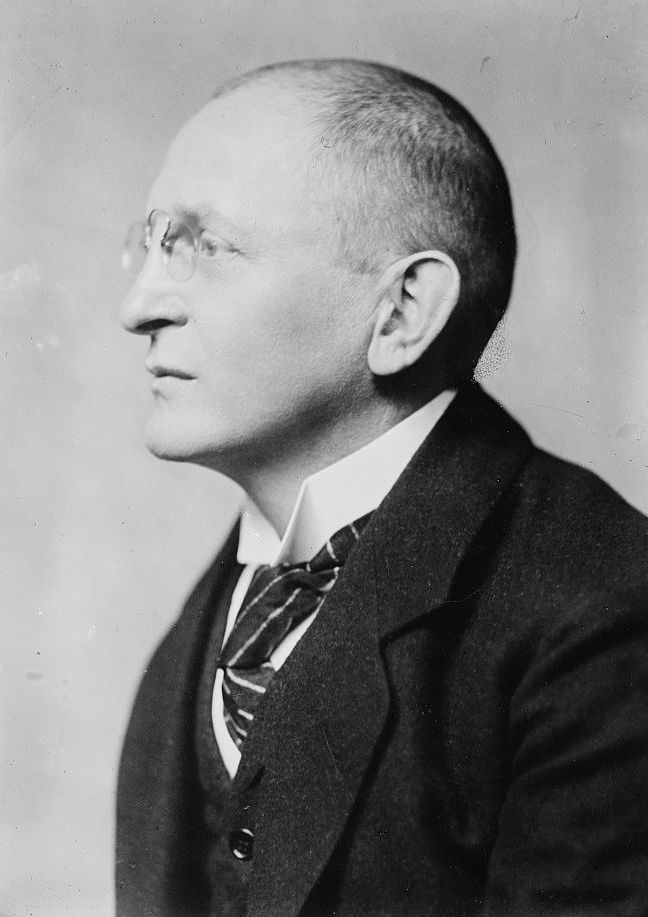
Erich Koch-Weser (DDP), Vice-Chancellor and Minister of the Interior

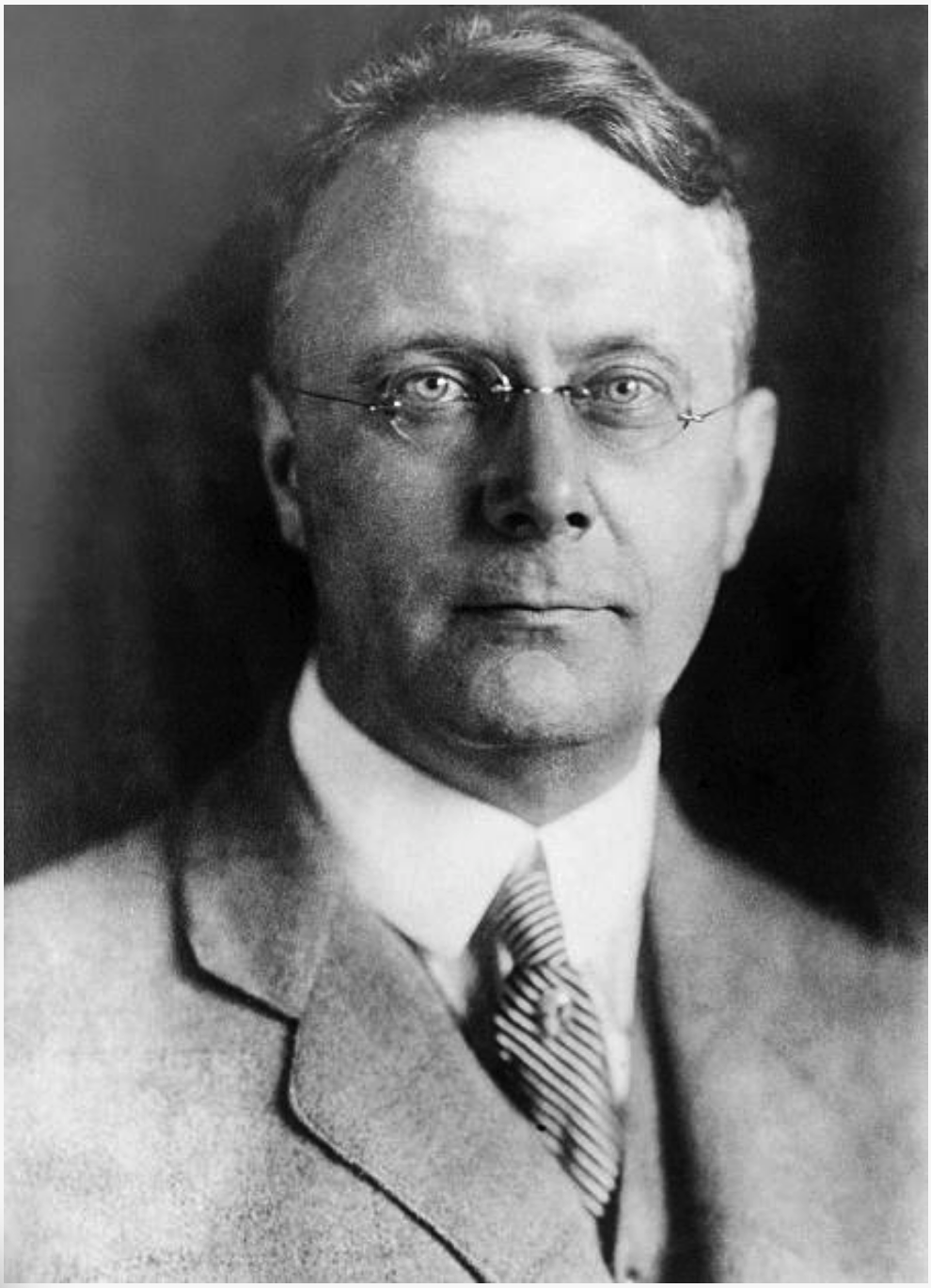
Adolf Köster (SPD), Minister of Foreign Affairs after Müller

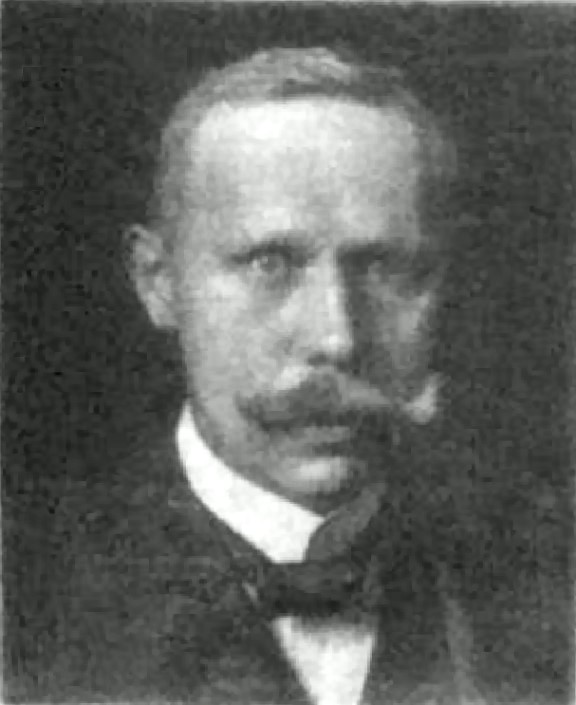
Andreas Blunck (DDP), Minister of Justice

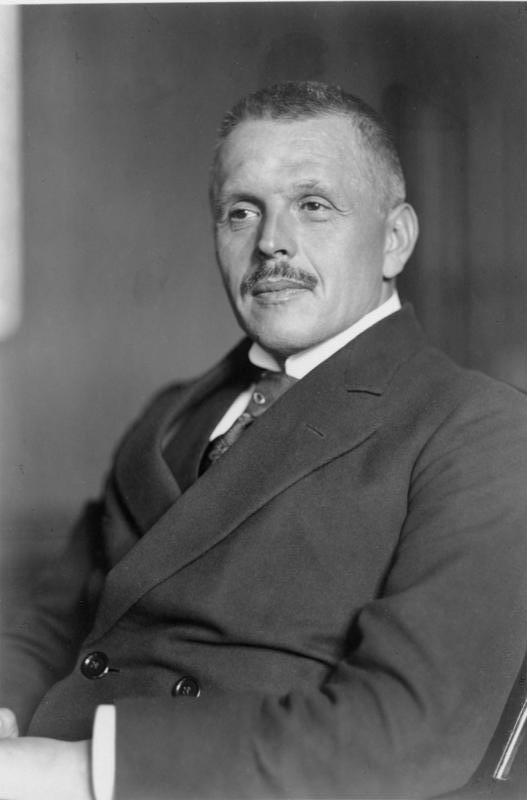
Otto Gessler (DDP), Reichswehr Minister

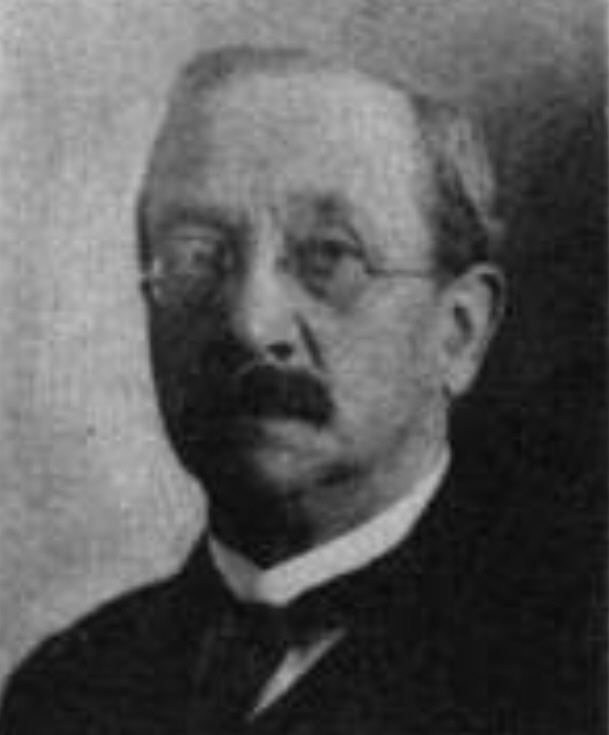
Robert Schmidt (SPD), Minister of Economic Affairs

In late March 1920, when President Friedrich Ebert (SPD) asked Hermann Müller (SPD) to form a new government, the parliament of Germany was still the Weimar National Assembly. It served as the acting Reichstag according to the Law on Provisional Reich Power that the Assembly had passed on 10 February 1919. Elections for the new Reichstag had yet to be held. The cabinet was based on the SPD, Centre Party and German Democratic Party (DDP). The three parties accounted for 331 out of a total of 423 seats in the National Assembly and were known as the Weimar Coalition.

The previous government, led by Gustav Bauer, also SPD, had become untenable and finally resigned on 26 March 1920 as a result of the Kapp-Lüttwitz Putsch. In the wake of the putsch's collapse, caused not least by a national general strike, the Free Trade Unions drew up an eight-point agenda as conditions for ending the strike. They demanded the punishment of the putschists, dissolution of associations hostile to the constitution, new social laws and the socialisation of "appropriate" industries. They also demanded the right to participate in the creation of a new government. Although Otto Wels for the SPD rejected the harsh form in which union leader and Reichstag member Carl Legien had presented the unions' demands, the SPD accepted that both the current government and the government of the state of Prussia had been compromised and discredited by the putsch and would have to resign. The new government was to be based on politicians not tainted by the charge of having – voluntarily or involuntarily – aided and abetted the putsch. It was a position not shared by the SPD's coalition partners. The DDP did not see itself bound by any conditions the unions had attached to the ending of the general strike. Although the formation of a new government and restoring order in Germany became increasingly pressing with the threat of a general uprising from the left (the Ruhr uprising), the positions of the coalition partners seemed to move further apart.

On the left, both Legien and Rudolf Wissell were unwilling to become chancellor. The eventual government to emerge thus largely ignored the unions' eight points. No changes to coalition partners were possible. The right-wing DVP had disqualified itself by its behaviour during the putsch and the left-wing Independent Social Democrats (USPD) insisted on a purely socialist government. Within the SPD, some favoured a coalition with the USPD, but the risk of a civil war or outright secession by some states in southern Germany was ultimately seen as too great. The decision ended all attempts to move ahead with the socialisation project that was promoted by many on the left, such as Rudolf Hilferding.

On 24 March, President Ebert called the leaders of the coalition parties to discuss the new cabinet. The SPD had settled on Hermann Müller as the new chancellor. The previous chancellor, Gustav Bauer, although blamed by many for not having prevented the putsch, remained in the new cabinet in a much lower profile job as Treasury minister. Former vice-chancellor and minister of Justice Eugen Schiffer (DDP), who had been at the forefront of those negotiating with the putschists, did not become a member of the new cabinet. However, many other ministers of the Bauer cabinet remained. Müller had been foreign minister under Chancellor Bauer and retained the office until a replacement was found in April 1920.

Two other vacancies had resulted from the earlier resignations of Matthias Erzberger as Finance minister in March and of Wilhelm Mayer as Treasury minister in January 1920. The positions were filled by Joseph Wirth, who took over as Finance minister and Bauer, who became Treasury minister. Notably absent from the new cabinet was Gustav Noske (SPD), who as minister of the Reichswehr (Armed Forces) had been ultimately responsible for the lack of a military response to the Kapp-Lüttwitz Putsch and who had been in charge of previous military action against left-wing uprisings. Although President Ebert wanted to keep Noske, the unions and many in the SPD demanded his resignation, arguing that he had been too ready to use force against the leftist uprisings and too lenient towards the right-wing putschists, both before and after the actual putsch.

It was difficult to find candidates for some positions. Otto Wels was considered the minister of the Reichswehr, but was told that his appointment would result in a mass exodus of officers and therefore withdrew. Wilhelm Cuno, who offered the Ministry of Finance, also declined. Otto Landsberg said he did not feel up to the job of leading the Foreign Office. Müller himself, who agreed only reluctantly to take on the chancellorship, at times considered handing back the task of forming a government.

== Members ==
The members of the cabinet were as follows:

Portfolio	Minister	Took office	Left office	Party
Chancellorship	Hermann Müller	27 March 1920	21 June 1920	SPD
Vice-chancellorship	Erich Koch-Weser	27 March 1920	21 June 1920	DDP
Foreign Affairs	Hermann Müller	27 March 1920	10 April 1920	SPD
Foreign Affairs	Adolf Köster	10 April 1920	21 June 1920	SPD
Interior	Erich Koch-Weser	27 March 1920	21 June 1920	DDP
Justice	Andreas Blunck	27 March 1920	21 June 1920	DDP
Labour	Alexander Schlicke	27 March 1920	21 June 1920	SPD
Reichswehr	Otto Gessler	27 March 1920	21 June 1920	DDP
Economic Affairs	Robert Schmidt	27 March 1920	21 June 1920	SPD
Finance	Joseph Wirth	27 March 1920	21 June 1920	Centre
Treasury	Gustav Bauer	27 March 1920	21 June 1920	SPD
Food and Agriculture	Andreas Hermes	30 March 1920	21 June 1920	Centre
Transport	Johannes Bell	27 March 1920	1 May 1920	Centre
Transport	Gustav Bauer	1 May 1920	21 June 1920	SPD
Postal affairs	Johannes Giesberts	27 March 1920	21 June 1920	Centre
Reconstruction	Vacant	–	–	–
Without portfolio	Eduard David	27 March 1920	21 June 1920	SPD

== In office ==
The Müller government spent much of its short life dealing with the Ruhr uprising, a radical left-wing revolt that grew out of the general strike against the Kapp Putsch in an attempt to set up a dictatorship of the proletariat. The Reichswehr and Freikorps units that the cabinet sent against the insurgents were able to suppress them by 12 April at the cost of about 1,350 lives. The state of emergency that President Ebert had declared at the uprising's outbreak was lifted only on 25 May.

== Resignation ==
After the events of the Kapp Putsch, the date for the elections to the new Reichstag was brought forward to 6 June 1920. The cabinet resigned as a result of the outcome of the elections. The SPD went from 163 seats in the National Assembly to just 102 in the new Reichstag. The number of people voting for the SPD plunged from 11.5 million in the January 1919 National Assembly elections to 6.1 million in June 1920. The share of votes cast for the three coalition parties shrank from 76.1% in 1919 to 43.5%. Many on the left who had been disappointed with the biased way the SPD-led government had dealt with the right-wing and left-wing revolts in the spring voted for the more leftist USPD instead. Its share of the popular vote rose from 7.6% in 1919 to 17.8% in 1920.

Since the SPD remained the largest party in the Reichstag, President Ebert first asked Müller to form a new cabinet. Müller tried to convince the USPD to join his government, but its chairman refused to participate in any coalition that was not purely socialist and in which the USPD was not the majority party. As Müller was unwilling to work with the German People's Party (DVP), he handed back the task of forming a government.

The "bourgeois" parties then decided to form a minority government without the Social Democrats. The SPD promised to support it in foreign policy and on questions of reparations to the Allies. The new government was formed by Constantin Fehrenbach of the Centre Party, who had been president of the National Assembly. It was based on the Centre Party, DDP and – for the first time – the centre-right DVP led by Gustav Stresemann, which had received 13.9% of the vote (up from 4.4% in 1919). The cabinet ended the period of government by the Weimar Coalition that had been in office from February 1919 to June 1920.
