= Frank Schwabe =

German politician (born 1970)

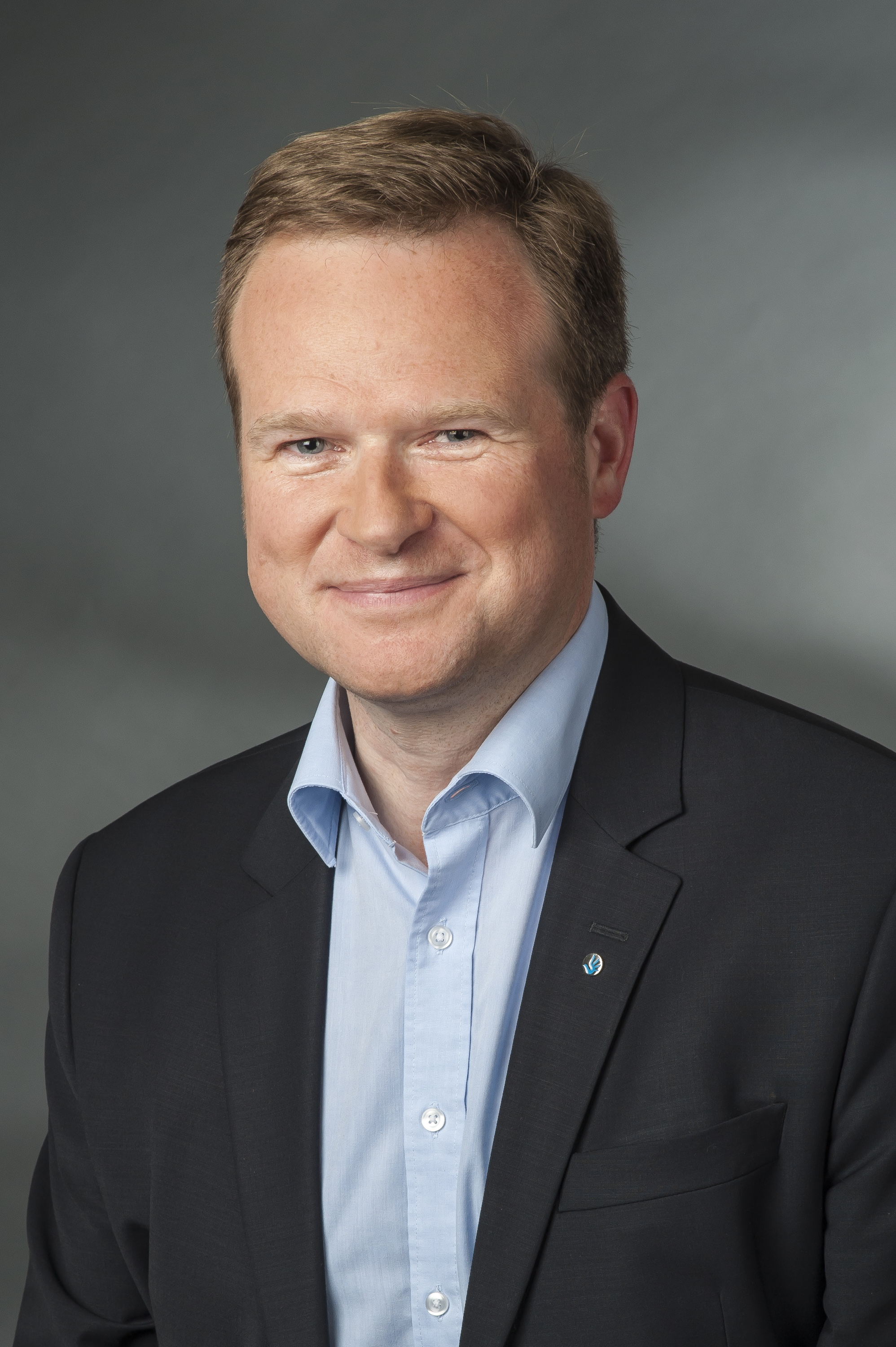
- Schwabe in 2014

Member of the Bundestag
- Incumbent
- Assumed office 2005

Personal details
- Born: 12 November 1970 (age 55) Waltrop, West Germany
- Party: SPD
- Education: University of Essen

Frank Schwabe (born 12 November 1970) is a German politician of the Social Democratic Party (SPD) who has been serving as a member of the Bundestag from the state of North Rhine-Westphalia since 2005.

In addition to his parliamentary work, Schwabe has been serving as a Parliamentary State Secretary at the Federal Ministry of Justice and Consumer Protection in the government of Chancellor Friedrich Merz since 2025. From 2022 to 2025, he was the Commissioner for Global Freedom of Religion at the Federal Ministry for Economic Cooperation and Development in the government of Chancellor Olaf Scholz.

== Political career ==
Schwabe first became a member of the Bundestag after the 2005 German federal election, representing the Recklinghausen I district.

In parliament, Schwabe has served on the Committee on Environment, Nature Conservation and Nuclear Safety (2005–2021), the Committee on Human Rights and Humanitarian Aid (2014–2025), the Committee on Foreign Affairs (2021–2025) and the Subcommittee on International Climate and Energy Policy (2022–2025). He also served as his parliamentary group's spokesperson on human rights and humanitarian aid.

Within the SPD parliamentary group, Schwabe belongs to the Parliamentary Left, a left-wing movement.

In addition to his committee assignments, Schwabe was member of the German delegation to the Parliamentary Assembly of the Council of Europe (PACE) from 2014 to 2025. In the Assembly, he served on the Committee on Political Affairs and Democracy; the Committee on the Honouring of Obligations and Commitments by the Member States of the Council of Europe (Monitoring Committee); the Committee on Rules of Procedure, Immunities, and Institutional Affairs; the Committee on Legal Affairs and Human Rights; and the Committee on Migration, Refugees and Displaced Persons. In 2018, he was elected chairman of the Socialists, Democrats and Greens Group. From 2010, he also served as the Assembly's rapporteur on human rights and the rule of law in the North Caucasus. In 2025, he authored a report on anti-corruption mesaures.

In the negotiations to form a so-called traffic light coalition of the SPD, the Green Party and the Free Democrats (FDP) following the 2021 German elections, Schwabe was part of his party's delegation in the working group on migration and integration, co-chaired by Boris Pistorius, Luise Amtsberg and Joachim Stamp. In the negotiations to form a Grand Coalition under the leadership of Friedrich Merz's Christian Democrats (CDU together with the Bavarian CSU) and the SPD following the 2025 German elections, he was part of the SPD delegation in the working group on foreign affairs, defense, development cooperation and human rights, led by Johann Wadephul, Florian Hahn and Svenja Schulze.

== Other activities ==
- German Institute for Human Rights (DIMR), Member of the Board of Trustees
- University of Hagen, Member of the Parliamentary Advisory Board (since 2018)
- German Federation for the Environment and Nature Conservation (BUND), Member
- IG BCE, Member
- FC Schalke 04, Member
- Brot für die Welt, Member of the Committee on Development and Humanitarian Aid (2014–2017)
