= Heinrich von Friedberg =

German jurist and statesman (1813–1895)

Minister of Justice of Prussia
- In office 30 October 1879 – 17 January 1889
- Monarchs: Wilhelm I Friedrich III; Wilhelm II
- Prime Minister: Otto von Bismarck
- Preceded by: Adolph Leonhardt
- Succeeded by: Hermann von Schelling

State Secretary for Justice
- In office 21 December 1876 – 30 October 1879
- Monarchs: Wilhelm I Friedrich III
- Chancellor: Otto von Bismarck
- Preceded by: Position established
- Succeeded by: Hermann von Schelling

Personal details
- Born: Heinrich von Friedberg; 8 January 1813 Mirosławiec, Province of Pomerania, Kingdom of Prussia
- Died: 2 June 1895 (aged 82) Berlin, Kingdom of Prussia, German Empire
- Party: Independent
- Education: University of Berlin

Heinrich von Friedberg (27 January 1813 – 2 June 1895) was a German jurist and statesman who played a significant role in shaping Prussian and later German legal frameworks during the 19th century. A political independent, he served as State Secretary for Justice from 1876 to 1879 and Minister of Justice of Prussia from 1879 util his retirement in 1889.

== Early life ==
Friedberg was born in Märkisch Friedland in West Prussia. He studied law at the University of Berlin, earning his degree in 1836. He was attached to the Kammergericht at Berlin, where he became district attorney in 1848.

== Legal and political career ==
By 1846, Friedberg had become a key figure in Prussian legislative reforms. Under Prussian Justice Minister Alexander von Uhden, he was instrumental in establishing oral and public trial procedures in Prussia. Friedberg advocated for a strong public prosecution system that would investigate all legal violations while also considering exculpatory evidence. He also sought to grant prosecutorial authority over police investigations, though this idea was not fully implemented.

In 1850, Friedberg became Chief Public Prosecutor in Greifswald and also taught as a private lecturer at the University of Greifswald. He later moved to the Prussian Ministry of Justice in Berlin, where he was appointed Geheimer Justizrat (Privy Judicial Councillor) in 1854 and Geheimer Oberjustizrat (Senior Privy Judicial Councillor) in 1857.

In 1868, Friedberg was tasked with drafting a penal code for the North German Confederation. His efforts led to the completion of the code on 31 May 1870, which took effect on 1 January 1871. Following the establishment of the German Empire, this penal code was largely adopted as the Reichsstrafgesetzbuch (Imperial Penal Code). He also contributed to discussions on military law as a member of the Military Penal Code Commission and as a federal commissioner.

In 1870, Friedberg was appointed President of the Judicial Examination Commission. In 1872, he became Wirklicher Geheimer Oberjustizrat (Real Senior Privy Judicial Councillor) and a member of the Prussian House of Lords. By 1873, he was Undersecretary of State in the Prussian Ministry of Justice, where he drafted a German Code of Criminal Procedure.

In 1875, he was appointed Crown Syndic, and on December 21, 1876, he became State Secretary of the newly created Imperial Justice Office under Chancellor Otto von Bismarck. In 1879, he succeeded Adolph Leonhardt as Prussian Minister of State and Minister of Justice, a position he held until 1889. For his service, he was ennobled in 1888 upon receiving the Order of the Black Eagle by Emperor Frederick III. He resigned from his official positions in 1889.

Friedberg became a Protestant early in his career. He died in 1895 at the age of 82 in Berlin. He was buried in the Alter St.-Matthäus-Kirchhof in Schöneberg, but his grave has not been preserved. Among his works may be mentioned "Entwurf einer Deutschen Strafprozessordnung", Berlin, 1873

== See also ==
- List of German justice ministers
- List of justice ministers of Prussia
