= Hans A. Engelhard =

German politician (1934–2008)

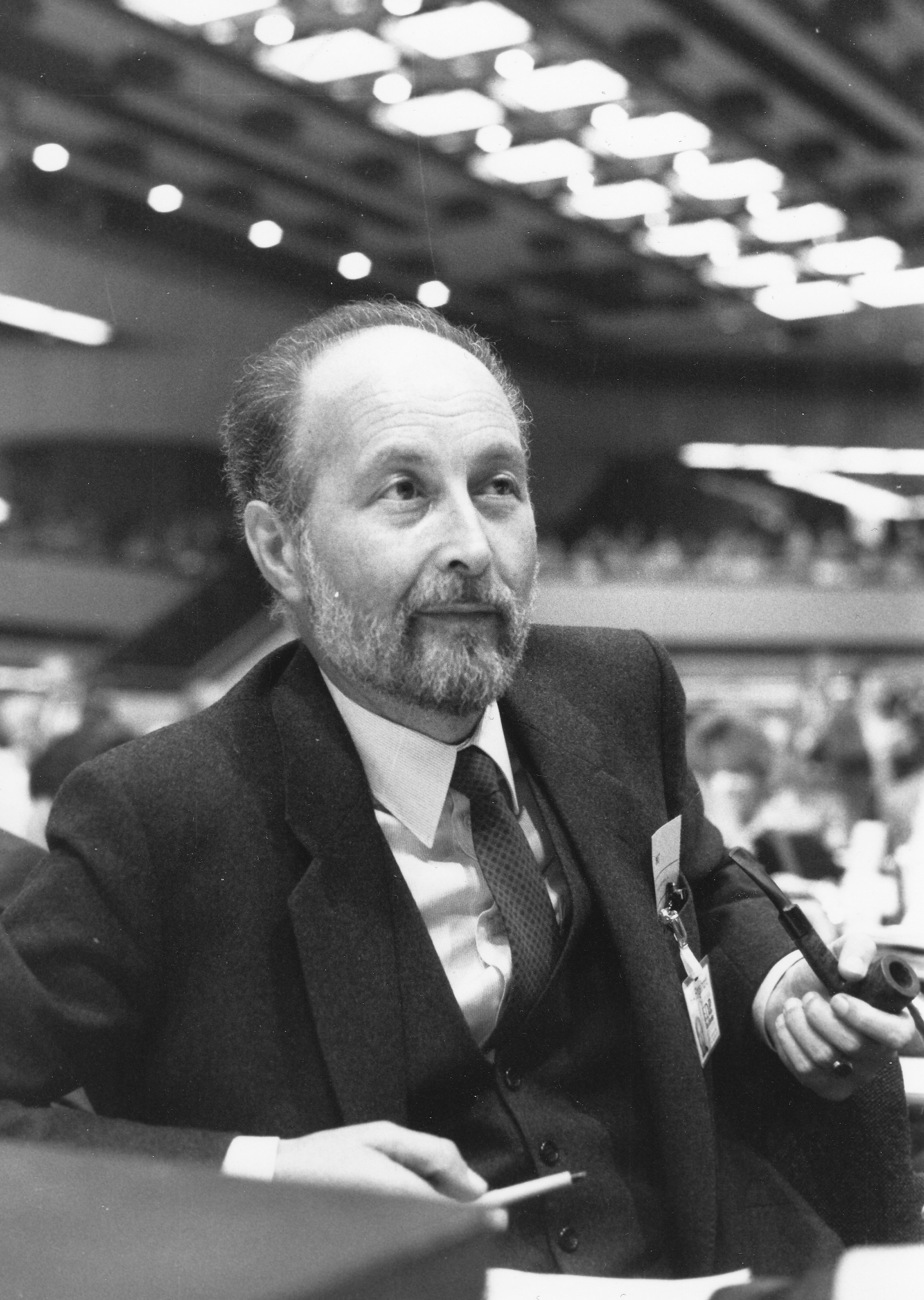
- Engelhard at the Free Democratic Party convention in 1982

Federal Minister of Justice of Germany
- In office 4 October 1982 – 18 January 1991
- Preceded by: Jürgen Schmude
- Succeeded by: Klaus Kinkel

Member of the Bundestag
- In office 13 December 1972 – 10 November 1994

Personal details
- Born: 16 September 1934 Munich, Bavaria, Germany
- Died: 11 March 2008 (aged 73) Munich, Bavaria, Germany
- Party: Free Democratic Party
- Education: LMU Munich
- Profession: Jurist

Hans Arnold Engelhard (16 September 1934 – 11 March 2008) was a German jurist. A member of the Free Democratic Party (FDP), he served as German Federal Minister of Justice in the Cabinet Kohl I, II, and III, between 1982 and 1991.

Born in Munich, Engelhard studied law at the University of Erlangen–Nuremberg and LMU Munich, and received his second Staatsexamen in 1963.

Having joined the Free Democratic Party in 1954, he won a seat in the Bundestag in the 1972 German federal election.

In 1982, he succeeded Jürgen Schmude as Federal Minister of Justice of Germany, and served until 1992.

== Awards ==
- 1984: Bayerischer Verdienstorden
- 1989: Bundesverdienstkreuz
