= Michael Breilmann =

German politician

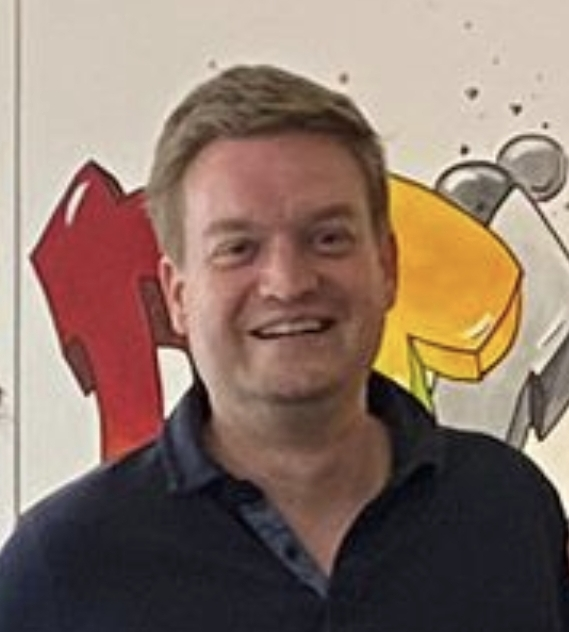

Member of the Bundestag
- In office 2021 – March 2025

Personal details
- Born: 10 October 1983 (age 42) Herne
- Party: CDU

Michael Breilmann (born 10 October 1983) is a German politician of the Christian Democratic Union (CDU) who has been serving as a member of the Bundestag from 2021 to March 2025.

== Early life and education ==
Breilmann was born 1983 in the West German city of Herne.

== Political career ==
Breilmann was elected to the Bundestag in the 2021 elections, representing the Recklinghausen I district.

In parliament, Breilmann has since been serving on the Committee on Internal Affairs and Community and the Committee on Housing, Urban Development, Building and Local Government. He is his parliamentary group's spokesperson for political extremism and antisemitism.

== Other activities ==
- Federal Agency for Civic Education (BPB), Member of the Board of Trustees (since 2022)
