= Jürgen Schmude =

German politician (1936–2025)

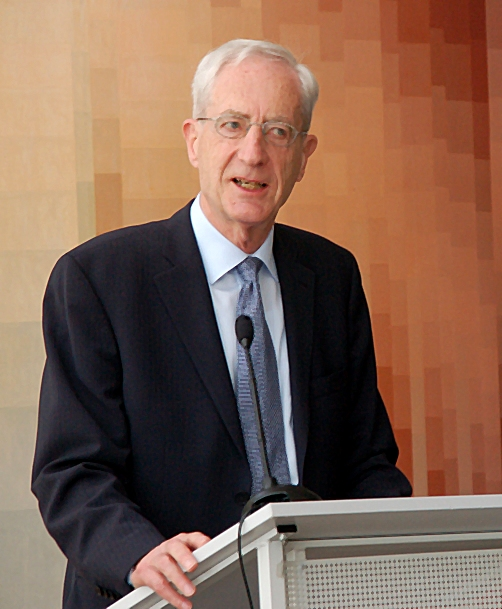
- Schmude in 2009

Federal Minister of the Interior
- In office 17 September 1982 – 1 October 1982
- Chancellor: Helmut Schmidt
- Preceded by: Gerhart Baum
- Succeeded by: Friedrich Zimmermann

Federal Minister of Justice
- In office 28 January 1981 – 1 October 1982
- Chancellor: Helmut Schmidt
- Preceded by: Hans-Jochen Vogel
- Succeeded by: Hans A. Engelhard

Federal Minister of Education and Science
- In office 16 February 1978 – 28 January 1981
- Chancellor: Helmut Schmidt
- Preceded by: Helmut Rohde
- Succeeded by: Björn Engholm

Member of the Bundestag for Wesel II
- In office 28 September 1969 – 2 December 1990
- Preceded by: Fritz Büttner
- Succeeded by: Peter Enders

Personal details
- Born: 9 June 1936 Insterburg, Gau East Prussia, Germany
- Died: 3 February 2025 (aged 88)
- Party: Social Democratic Party
- Education: University of Göttingen; University of Berlin; University of Bonn; University of Cologne
- Profession: Jurist

Jürgen Dieter Paul Schmude (9 June 1936 – 3 February 2025) was a German politician of the Social Democratic Party of Germany (SPD).

Schmude was born in Insterburg, Gau East Prussia, Germany, (now Chernyakhovsk, Russia). He was a member of the German Parliament, the Bundestag, from 1969 to 1994. From 1978 to 1981, he was Federal German Minister for Education and Science and later Federal Minister of Justice from 1981 to 1982, then briefly Minister of the Interior in 1982. He was married and had two children. Schmude died on 3 February 2025, at the age of 88.
