= Karl Gutbrod =

German lawyer and judge (1844–1905)

Karl Konrad Gutbrod
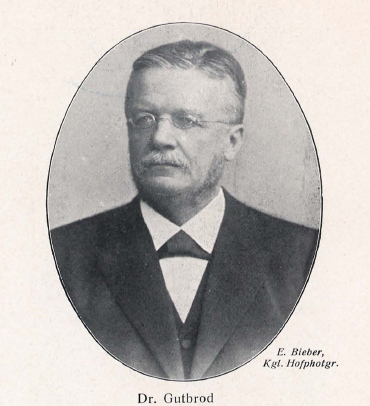
- Karl Konrad Gutbrod

President of the Reichsgericht
- In office 1 November 1903 – 17 April 1905
- Preceded by: Otto von Oehlschläger
- Succeeded by: Rudolf von Seckendorff

Personal details
- Born: 3 October 1844 Stuttgart, Württemberg
- Died: 17 April 1905 (aged 60) Leipzig, German Empire
- Spouse: Antonie Bareiß
- Children: Carl Gutbrod, Fritz Gutbrod, Otto Gutbrod
- Education: University of Tübingen
- Profession: jurist

Karl Konrad Gutbrod (10 March 1844 – 17 April 1905) was a German lawyer and judge. From 1 November 1903 until his death he was the President of the Reichsgericht, the supreme court of the Deutsches Reich.
