= Otto von Oehlschläger =

German jurist and politician (1831–1904)

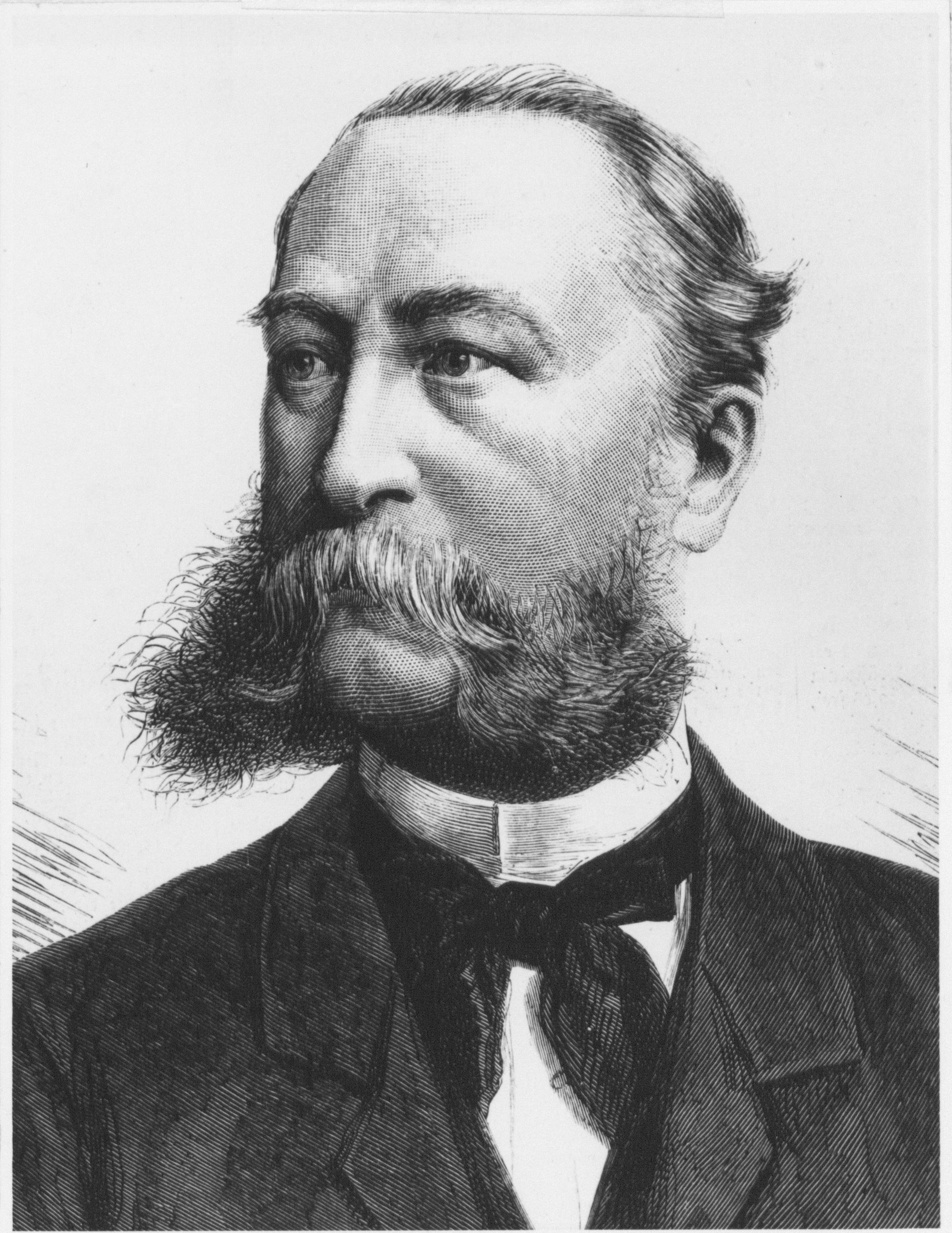
- Otto von Oehlschläger

Secretary of Justice
- In office February 1889 – 1891
- Chancellor: Otto von Bismarck; Leo von Caprivi
- Preceded by: Hermann von Schelling
- Succeeded by: Robert Bosse

President of the Reichsgericht
- In office February 1891 – 1 November 1903
- Preceded by: Eduard von Simson
- Succeeded by: Karl Gutbrod

Personal details
- Born: 16 May 1831 Blumenau-Heiligenwalde, East Prussia, Kingdom of Prussia
- Died: 14 January 1904 (aged 72) Charlottenburg, German Empire
- Spouse: Maria née Mellenthin (1840-1930)
- Children: Hans von Oehlschläger
- Education: University of Königsberg
- Profession: jurist

Otto Karl von Oehlschläger (16 May 1831 – 14 January 1904) was a German jurist and politician.

== Biography ==
Oehlschläger was born Otto Oehlschläger in Gut Heiligenwalde (modern Święty Gaj, Poland), he was ennobled ("von Oehlschäger") in 1888.

Oehlschläger studied law at the University of Königsberg, passed his final exam in 1858 and worked as a judge at Danzig (Gdańsk), Schwetz (Świecie) and Löbau (Lubawa). In 1864 he became a prosecutor at Marienwerder (modern Kwidzyn) and in Königsberg in 1870. In 1874 he was removed to the Prussian ministry of Justice in Berlin.

Since 1879 he was the Prussian Army's "Generalauditeur", as such responsible for reforms of the military penal law. In 1883 he became a member of the Prussian House of Lords and legal advisor of the Prussian crown, in 1884 a member of the Prussian Staatsrat and President of Berlin's Kammergericht on 1 January 1885.

In 1889 he became Secretary of State of the Reichsjustizamt and followed Eduard von Simson as President of the Reichsgericht in 1891. He remained in this position until his retirement in 1903.

Oehlschläger died in Berlin in 1904.
