= Adolf Köster =

German politician (1883–1930)

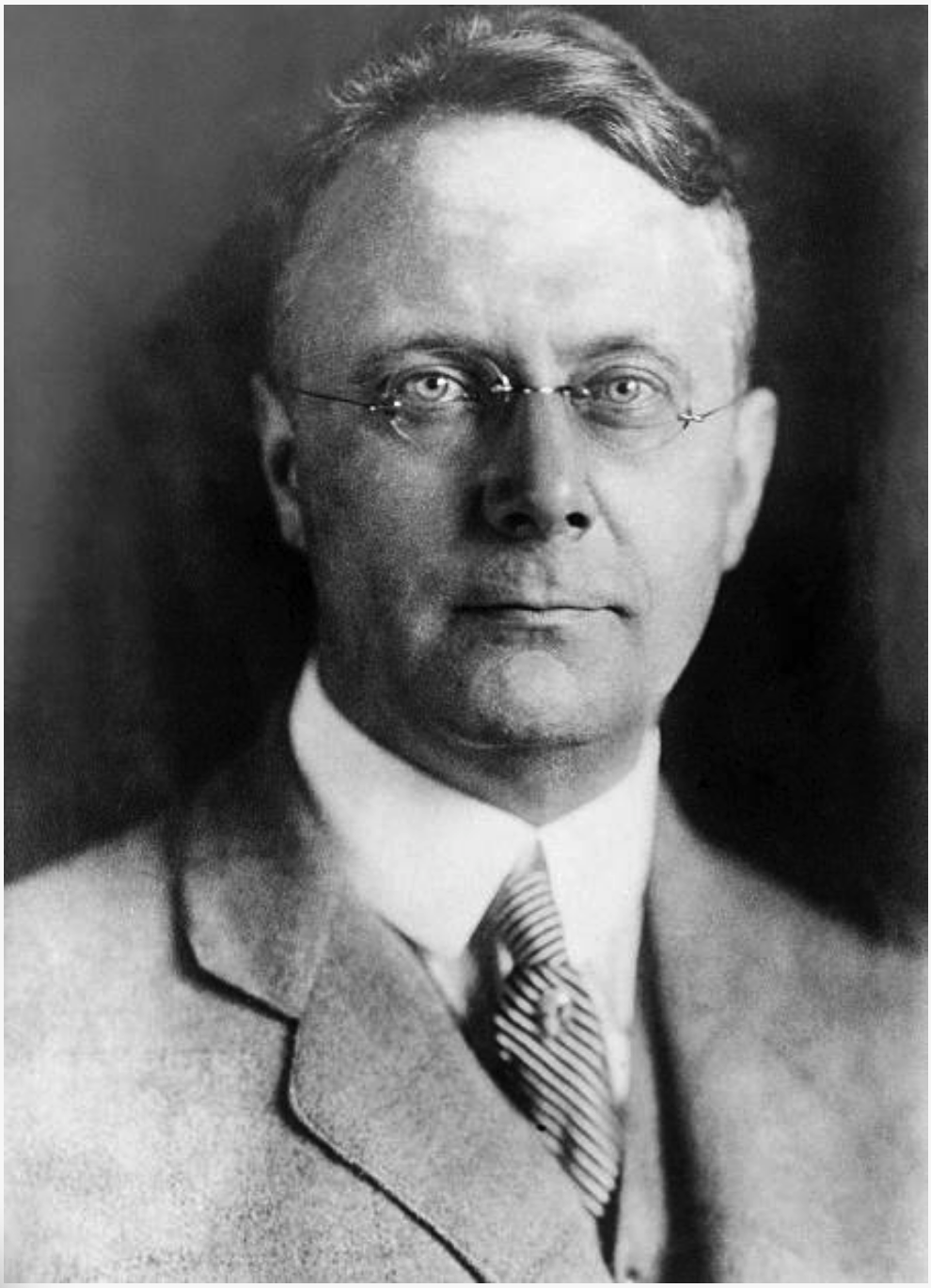
Adolf Köster (1920s)

Adolf Köster (8 March 1883 – 18 February 1930) was a German politician of the Social Democratic Party of Germany (SPD) and diplomat. He served as Foreign Minister (1920) and Interior Minister (1921–1922).

== Background ==
Adolf Köster was born on 8 March 1883 in Verden an der Aller in the Province of Hanover, Prussia. He grew up in Kappeln.

In 1906, he became a member of the Social Democratic Party of Germany (SPD). In 1907, he was awarded a Dr. phil. and in 1912 habilitated in history of literature. He taught at the Technical University of Munich.

During the First World War, he was a war correspondent for SPD newspapers like Vorwärts as well as for the Berliner Tageblatt.

== Political career ==
Following the November Revolution in 1918, he started to work as a Referent at the Reichskanzlei. In 1919, he worked for the Prussian Staatskommissar in Schleswig-Holstein, where he had grown up. He was Abstimmungskommissar, and in that function worked successfully for German interests in the plebiscites.

He served as Foreign Minister of Germany from 10 April to 21 June 1920 in the first cabinet of Hermann Müller based on SPD, the Zentrum and the liberal German Democratic Party (DDP).

In the second cabinet of Joseph Wirth (Zentrum, SPD, DDP), he served as Minister of the Interior of Germany from 26 October 1921 to 14 November 1922.

Köster was also a member of the Reichstag from 1920 to 1924.

== Diplomatic career ==
After serving as Envoy to Riga from 1923 to 1928, he was appointed in 1928 as Envoy to Belgrade. He died in Belgrade in 1930.

== Publications ==
- Fort mit der Dolchstoßlegende! Warum wir 1918 nicht weiterkämpfen konnten. Berlin: Verlag für Politik und Wissenschaft, 1922.
- Mit den Bulgaren. Kiegsberichte aus Serbien und Mazedonien. Verlag Albert Langen, München, 1916.
- Wandernde Erde. Kriegsberichte aus dem Westen. Verlag Albert Langen, München, 1917.

== Literature ==
- Hiden, John: Adolf Köster und Paul Schiemann in Riga. Deutsche Ostpolitik nach dem Ersten Weltkrieg. in: Norbert Angermann et al.: Ostseeprovinzen, Baltische Staaten und das Nationale. LIT Verlag, Münster 2005, ISBN 3-8258-9086-4
- Biographisches Lexikon des Sozialismus Band I Verlag J.H.W. Dietz Nachf., Hannover 1960, p. 164-165

Political offices
Preceded by Hermann Müller	Minister for Foreign Affairs; 1920	Succeeded by Walter Simons
Preceded by Georg Gradnauer	Minister of the Interior; 1921–1922	Succeeded by Rudolf Oeser
