= Reichsjustizamt =

Highest law authority of the German Empire

Reichsjustizamt (English: Imperial Justice Office) was the highest authority of the law in the German Empire, and was the predecessor of Reichsministerium der Justiz, the Reich Ministry of Justice.

Reichsjustizamt was under the jurisdiction of the Reichskanzler or Imperial Chancellor as Department IV from 1875 until 1 January 1877 when it became independent. Under Reichsjustizamt were the Imperial Court, the Imperial Bar, and the Imperial Patent Office. An Undersecretary of State managed the Reichsjustizamt. It continued becoming the Reichsministerium der Justiz in 1919.

Undersecretary of States of the Reichsjustizamt
Name	Period of Office
Heinrich Friedberg (1813-1895)	21 December 1876 - 30 October 1879
Hermann von Schelling (1824-1908)	19 November 1879 - 31 January 1889
Otto von Oehlschläger (1831-1904)	19 February 1889 - 2 February 1891
Robert Bosse (1832-1901)	2 February 1891 - 24 March 1892
Eduard Hanauer (1829-1893)	2 April 1892 - 30 April 1893
Rudolf Arnold Nieberding (1838-1912)	11 July 1893 - 25 October 1909
Hermann Lisco (1850-1923)	25 October 1909 - 5 August 1917
Paul von Krause (1852-1923)	7 August 1917 - 13 February 1919
