= Bernhard Winkelheide =

German politician

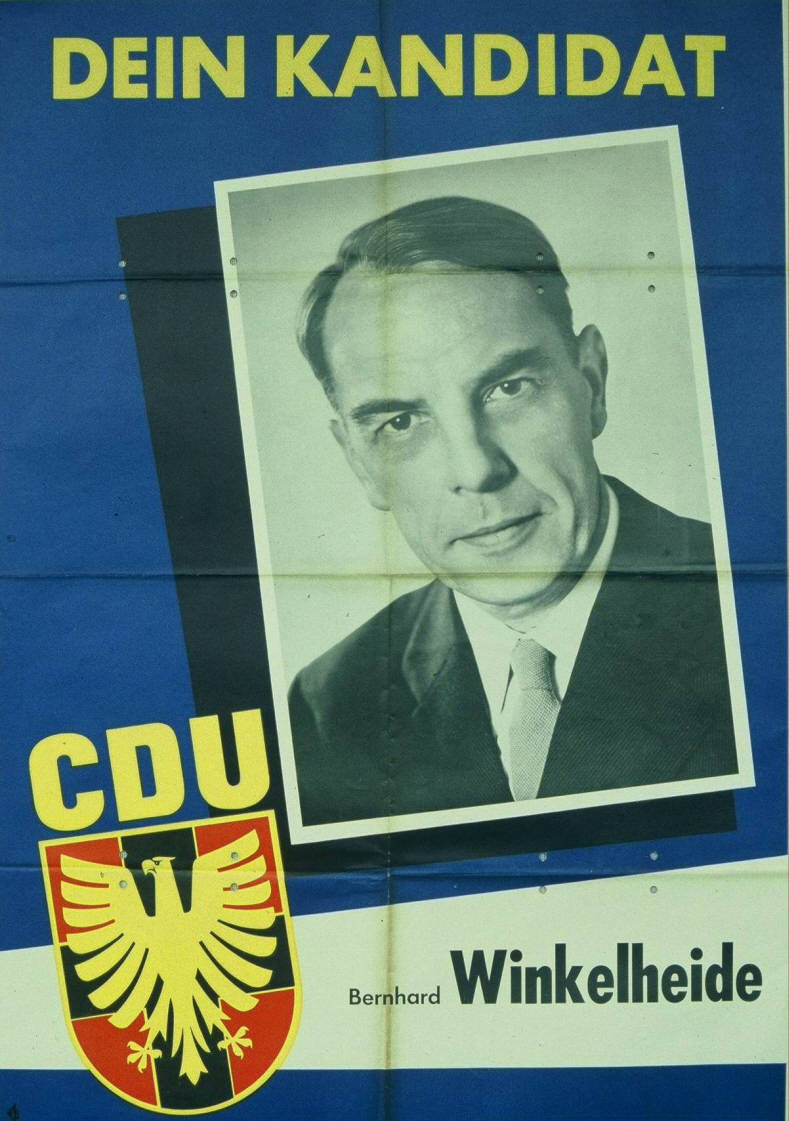
- Bernhard Winkelheide on a campaign poster for the 1957 federal elections

Member of the Bundestag
- In office 7 September 1949 – 22 September 1972

Personal details
- Born: 4 May 1908
- Died: 25 November 1988 (aged 80)
- Party: CDU

Bernhard Winkelheide (May 4, 1908 – November 25, 1988) was a German politician of the Christian Democratic Union (CDU) and former member of the German Bundestag.

== Life ==
He was a member of the German Bundestag from its first election in 1949 to 1972. In the Bundestag elections of 1949, 1953 and 1957 he won the direct mandate in the constituency of Recklinghausen-Stadt. In 1961, 1965 and 1969 he entered parliament via the state list of the CDU North Rhine-Westphalia.

== Literature ==
Herbst, Ludolf; Jahn, Bruno (2002). Vierhaus, Rudolf (ed.). Biographisches Handbuch der Mitglieder des Deutschen Bundestages. 1949–2002 [Biographical Handbook of the Members of the German Bundestag. 1949–2002] (in German). München: De Gruyter - De Gruyter Saur. p. 1715. ISBN 978-3-11-184511-1.
