= Hermann Müller (politician, born 1876) =

Chancellor of Germany (1920, 1928–1930)

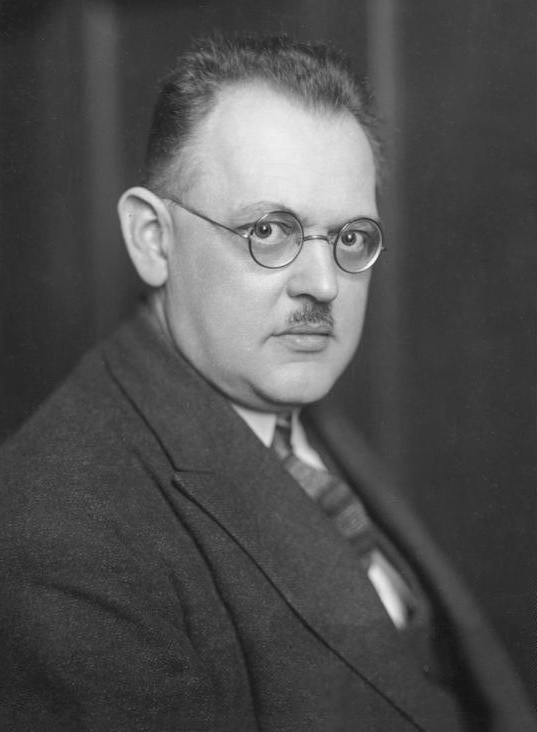
- Müller in 1928

Chancellor of Germany (Weimar Republic)
- In office 28 June 1928 – 27 March 1930
- President: Paul von Hindenburg
- Preceded by: Wilhelm Marx
- Succeeded by: Heinrich Brüning
- In office 27 March 1920 – 21 June 1920
- President: Friedrich Ebert
- Deputy: Erich Koch-Weser
- Preceded by: Gustav Bauer
- Succeeded by: Constantin Fehrenbach

Foreign Minister of Germany
- In office 21 June 1919 – 26 March 1920
- President: Friedrich Ebert
- Chancellor: Gustav Bauer
- Preceded by: Ulrich von Brockdorff-Rantzau
- Succeeded by: Adolf Köster

Member of the Reichstag (Weimar Republic)
- In office 6 June 1920 – 20 March 1931
- Constituency: Franconia

(German Empire)
- In office 1 February 1916 – 9 November 1918
- Constituency: Breslau 11

Member of the Weimar National Assembly
- In office 6 February 1919 – 21 May 1920
- Constituency: Breslau

Personal details
- Born: Hermann Müller; 18 May 1876 Mannheim, Germany
- Died: 20 March 1931 (aged 54) Berlin, Germany
- Party: SPD
- Spouses: Frieda Tockus (m. 1902; died 1905); Gottliebe Jaeger (m. 1909)
- Children: 2 (Annemarie and Erika)

Hermann Müller (18 May 1876 – 20 March 1931;) was a German Social Democratic politician who served as foreign minister (1919–1920) and was twice chancellor of Germany (1920, 1928–1930) during the Weimar Republic.

Müller rose quickly through the ranks of the Social Democratic Party (SPD) after joining it in 1893. He was elected to the Reichstag of the German Empire in 1916 and to the Weimar National Assembly in 1919. In his capacity as foreign minister, he was one of the German signatories of the Treaty of Versailles (28 June 1919).

During the three months Müller was chancellor in 1920, his government passed a number of progressive social reforms before it had to resign due to the Social Democratic Party of Germany's (SPD) poor showing in the 1920 election. In his second term as chancellor, from June 1928 to 1930, he led a grand coalition through a period marked by budgetary and international relations issues. The coalition broke apart after the onset of the Great Depression, and Müller, already suffering from poor health, died a year after leaving office.

== Early life ==
Hermann Müller was born on 18 May 1876 in Mannheim in the Grand Duchy of Baden, the son of Georg Jakob Müller (born 1843), a producer of sparkling wine and wine dealer from Güdingen near Saarbrücken, and his wife Karoline (née Vogt, born 1849, died after 1931), originally from Frankfurt am Main. Müller attended grammar school at Mannheim and, after his father moved to Niederlößnitz in 1888, at Dresden. After his father died in 1892, Müller had to leave school due to financial difficulties and began an apprenticeship in Frankfurt. He worked in Frankfurt and Breslau, and in 1893 joined the Social Democratic Party of Germany (SPD). Heavily influenced by his father's interest in the philosophy of the critic of Christianity Ludwig Feuerbach, Hermann Müller was the only German chancellor who was not a member of any religion.

== Political career ==
=== Before 1918: entry into the SPD and Reichstag ===
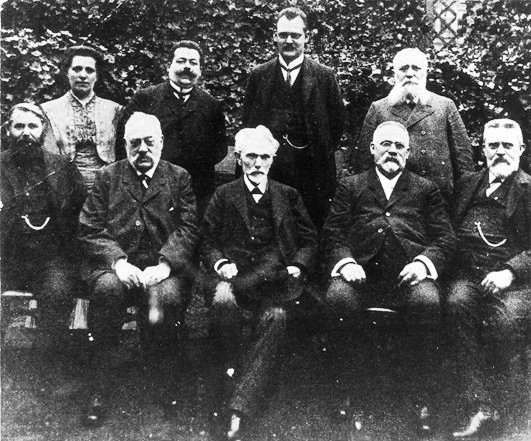
The SPD Party Executive Committee in 1909. Müller stands second from right.

From 1899 to 1906, Müller worked as an editor at the socialist newspaper Görlitzer Volkswacht. He was a member of the Görlitz city council from 1903 to 1906 and a party functionary (Unterbezirksvorsitzender). August Bebel, the Social Democratic Party of Germany (SPD) chairman, nominated him in 1905 (without success) and 1906 (successfully) for membership of the board of the national SPD. At that time, Müller changed from a left-wing Social Democrat to a centrist, who argued against both the Marxist reformists such as Eduard Bernstein and the radical Left around Rosa Luxemburg. Together with Friedrich Ebert, Müller in 1909 created a party executive committee that was to deal with internal arguments between party conventions. Known for his calm, industriousness, integrity and rationality, Müller lacked charisma. In 1909, he tried but failed to prevent Otto Braun's election to the board, laying the foundation for a long-running animosity between the two.

As a result of his foreign language skills, Müller was the representative of the SPD at the Second International, an organisation of socialist and labour parties, and at the conventions of socialist parties in other countries in western Europe. In late July 1914, during the July Crisis that led up to the outbreak of World War I, Müller was sent to Paris to negotiate with French socialists over a common stance towards the respective countries' proposals for war loans. No agreement was reached, however, and before Müller was able to report back, the SPD had already decided to support the first war loans in the Reichstag in the belief, fostered by the German government, that the war was purely defensive.

During World War I, Müller supported the political truce between Germany's political parties known as the Burgfrieden. He was used by the SPD leadership to deal with arguments with the party's left wing and as an in-house censor for the party newspaper Vorwärts to avoid its outright ban by the military authorities. After he was elected to the Reichstag in a 1916 by-election, he supported both the harsh Treaty of Brest-Litovsk with Russia and the entry of the SPD into the government of Max von Baden in October 1918. Baden was named chancellor after the army leadership decided that it could get better peace terms from the Allies and deflect the blame from itself for the lost war if the government was democratised and the socialists – whom they blamed for the loss – brought into it.

=== 1918 to 1919: revolution and National Assembly ===
During the German Revolution of 1918–1919, Müller was a member of the Greater Berlin Executive Council of Workers and Soldiers (Vollzugsrat der Arbeiter- und Soldatenräte Groß-Berlin) where he represented the position of the SPD leadership arguing in favor of elections to a constituent national assembly instead of the creation of a council republic as the more radical members of the Council wanted. He later published a book on his experience during the revolution.

In January 1919, Müller was elected to the Weimar National Assembly, which was to be Germany's interim parliament and draft a new constitution. In February, the Assembly elected Friedrich Ebert president of Germany and appointed Philipp Scheidemann as minister president (head of government). The two men had been the joint chairmen of the SPD, and Müller and Otto Wels were elected as their replacements with 373 and 291 out of 376 votes, respectively. Wels focused on internal leadership and organisation, whilst Müller was the external representative of the party. In 1919 and 1920–1928, Müller was also parliamentary party leader first in the Weimar National Assembly and then the Reichstag of the Weimar Republic. He was chosen chairman of the Reichstag's Committee on Foreign Affairs. In 1920, he won a seat in the Reichstag for Franconia (Franken in German) and changed his name to Müller-Franken to distinguish himself from other members named Müller.

=== 1920: first chancellorship ===
After Philipp Scheidemann resigned in June 1919 because he could not accept the terms of the Treaty of Versailles, Müller was asked to succeed him as head of government but declined. Under the new Reich Minister President and later Chancellor Gustav Bauer, Müller became foreign minister on 21 June 1919. In that capacity, he went to Versailles and with Colonial Minister Johannes Bell, signed the Treaty of Versailles for Germany on 29 June 1919.

After the resignation of the Bauer cabinet, which followed the Kapp-Lüttwitz Putsch in March 1920, Müller accepted Ebert's offer of becoming chancellor and formed a new government that was a continuation of the Weimar Coalition made up of the SPD, German Democratic Party (DDP) and Centre Party. Under his leadership, the government suppressed the left-wing insurgencies such as the Ruhr uprising and urged the disarmament of the paramilitary Einwohnerwehren (Citizens' Defence) demanded by the Allies. The newly created second commission on socialisation, which was tasked to examine ways of socialising parts of the German economy, admitted some members from the left-wing USPD because Müller felt that it was the only way workers would be willing to accept the commission's decisions. In social policy, Müller's time as chancellor saw the passage of a number of progressive social reforms. A comprehensive war-disability system was established in May 1920, while the Law on the Employment of the Disabled of April 1920 stipulated that all public and private employers with more than 20 employees were obligated to hire Germans disabled by accident or war and with at least a 50% reduction in their ability to work. The Basic School Law (passed on 28 April 1920) introduced a common four-year course in primary schools for all German children. Benefits for the unemployed were improved, with the maximum benefit for single males over the age of 21 increasing from 5 to 8 marks in May 1920. Maximum wage scales that were established in April 1919 were also increased.

On 29 March 1920 the Reichstag passed a Reich income-tax law, together with a law on corporate tax and a capital-yield tax. The Salary Reform Act, passed in April 1920, greatly improved the pay of civil servants. In May 1920, the Reich Office for Labour Allocation was set up as the first Reich-wide institution "to allocate labor, administer unemployment insurance and generally manage labor concerns". The Reich Insurance Code of May 1920 provided war-wounded persons and dependent survivors with therapeutic treatment and social welfare with the objective of reintegrating handicapped persons into working life. The Cripples' Welfare Act, passed that same month, made it a duty of the public welfare system to assist cripples under the age of 18 to obtain the capacity to earn an income. The Reich Homestead Act, passed in May 1920, sought to encourage homesteading as a means of helping economically vulnerable groups. The Reich Tenant Protection Order of 9 June 1920 sought to check evictions and "an immoderate increase of rental rates", authorising the states to set up tenancy offices made up of tenants' and owners' representatives, with a judge as chairman to settle disputes concerning rents. As noted by Frieda Wunderlich, they were entitled "to supervise the fixing of rents for all farms". During Müller's last year in office, a number of orders were introduced that "confirmed and defined the protective measures taken in connection with the employment of women in certain work of a particularly dangerous or arduous nature", which included glass-works, rolling mills, and iron foundries (through orders of 26 March 1930).

Müller was chancellor only until June 1920, when the outcome of the first regular election to the Reichstag resulted in the formation of a new government led by Constantin Fehrenbach of the Centre Party. The SPD suffered a significant defeat at the polls, with the number of people voting for them dropping almost by half compared to the January 1919 election. Discouraged, Müller only half-heartedly negotiated with the USPD about a coalition. He was turned down because the USPD was unwilling to join any coalition, including non-socialist parties and one in which the USPD was not the majority party. On the other side of the political spectrum, Müller was opposed to working with Gustav Stresemann's German People's Party (DVP), considering them a mouthpiece for corporate interests and doubting their loyalty to the republican constitution.

=== 1920 to 1928: SPD in opposition and coalitions ===
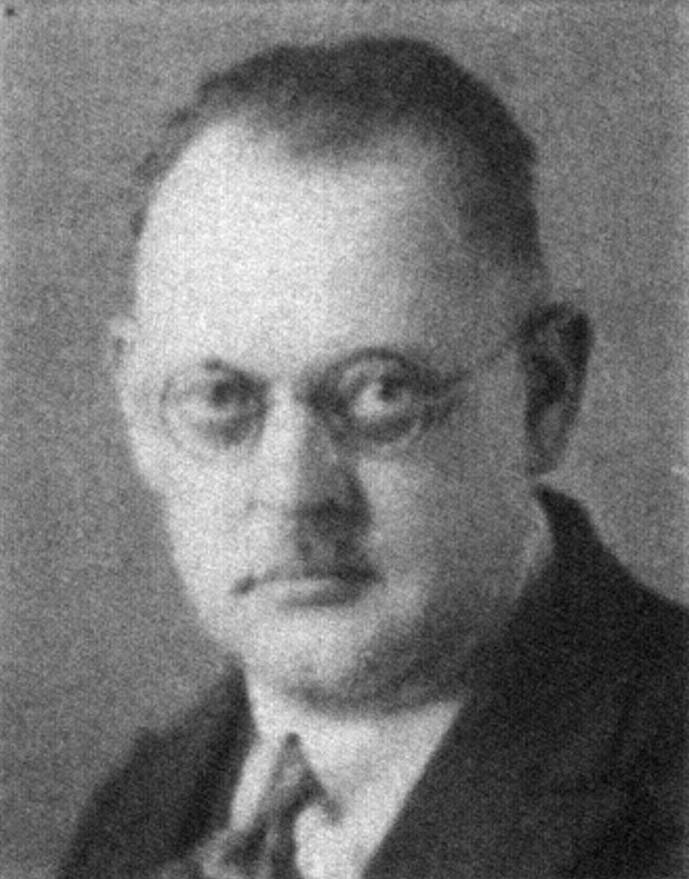
Müller's official Reichstag portrait, 1924

The SPD was now in the opposition regarding the domestic agenda of the new government while supporting its foreign policy, in particular regarding reparations to the Allies. Müller was an early advocate of joining the League of Nations and of moving politically closer to the West. He was critical of the Soviet Union's system of government, its revolutionary goals and its support for the radical left in Germany. However, he opposed a blockade of the Soviet Union by the Western Allies.

Initially, Müller favoured diplomatic relations with the Soviets only as far as they would help in preventing the integration of Upper Silesia into the new Polish state. He viewed the Treaty of Rapallo (1922) with the Soviets as a true peace treaty, but one that only had meaning within the context of a successful diplomatic policy towards the western powers, not as an alternative to it. Müller warned against attaching too much hope to the potential economic gains from the treaty, arguing that only the United States would be in a position to provide effective aid for the economic reconstruction of post-World War I Europe.

During the two governments led by Joseph Wirth (Centre Party) in 1921/1922 and in which the SPD participated as part of another Weimar Coalition, Müller demanded as parliamentary leader of the SPD that budget consolidation involve first and foremost higher taxation of wealth rather than of consumption. This led to confrontations with the middle class parties. Similarly, the reunification of SPD and USPD resulted in a move to the left by the new SPD. When the SPD refused to agree to letting the DVP join the existing coalition as desired by the Centre Party and DDP, the coalition broke apart in November 1922. The SPD did not participate in the following government of Wilhelm Cuno, an independent, which lasted until August 1923.

Recognising a national emergency when the French seized the Ruhr and inflation spiraled out of control in 1923, Müller brought the SPD into a grand coalition led by Gustav Stresemann of the DVP (August to November 1923). Differences in economic and social policies strained relations between the SPD and the other members of the coalition. Müller supported the emergency measures taken after the passage of the October 1923 enabling act, which allowed the government to enact extra-constitutional financial, economic and social measures without approval by the Reichstag. The Reich government was lenient in its handling of the right-wing leader of Bavaria, Gustav Ritter von Kahr, who was plotting a march on Berlin to overthrow the government, but it dealt harshly with the governments in Thuringia and Saxony, where the Communist Party of Germany (KPD) was brought into SPD-led governments as part of a USSR-backed plan to foment a communist revolution in Germany (the "German October"). The contrast in the Reich government's responses led the SPD to leave the coalition in November 1923.

At the party convention in 1924, Müller said that the SPD's stance towards coalitions was based less on principles than on tactics that were geared towards foreign policy. During their years in the opposition, the SPD supported a policy of reconciliation with the western powers, as exemplified by the Locarno Treaties, which settled Germany's western borders but left the eastern ones open to revision, and by Germany's entry to the League of Nations.

After November 1923, the SPD did not participate in a government again until June 1928.

=== 1928 to 1930: second chancellorship ===
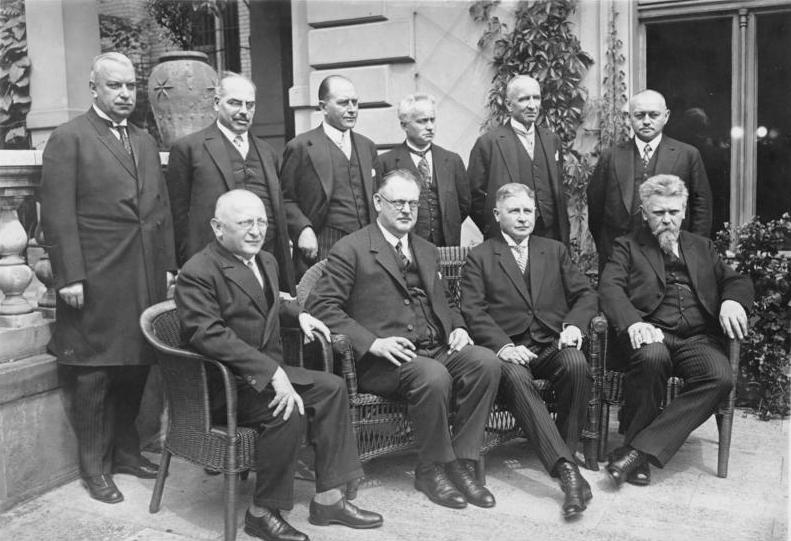
Müller's cabinet, June 1928. Standing, left to right: Hermann Dietrich, Rudolf Hilferding, Julius Curtius, Carl Severing, Theodor von Guérard, Georg Schätzel. Sitting: Erich Koch-Weser, Hermann Müller, Wilhelm Groener, Rudolf Wissell

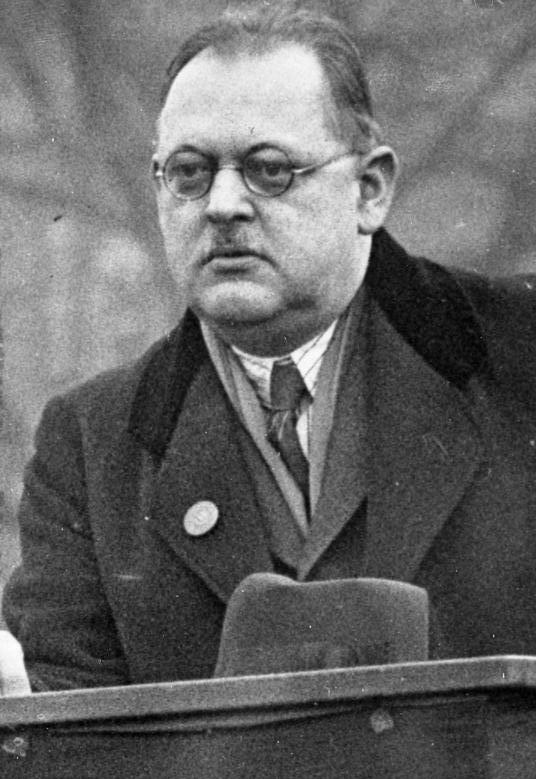
Müller in August 1928

The SPD was the clear winner of the May 1928 elections (153 of 491 seats). When the fourth cabinet of Wilhelm Marx (Centre Party) resigned on 12 June over its failure to come to an agreement on a national school law, the Social Democrats put Müller forward as their candidate for chancellor. Reich President Paul von Hindenburg would have preferred DVP chairman Ernst Scholz as chancellor but was persuaded to accept Müller by his inner circle, which expected a Social Democratic chancellorship to erode SPD support in the medium term. On 12 June 1928, Hindenburg entrusted Müller with forming the government. The other parties proved reluctant to compromise, and it took a personal intervention by Gustav Stresemann for a government to be formed on 28 June 1928. Müller's cabinet, a grand coalition of Social Democrats, Centre Party, DDP, DVP and BVP managed to settle only on a written agreement on the government's policies in the spring of 1929. In particular, domestic policy differences between the SPD and DVP dominated the government's work. Its continued existence was mainly due to the mutual personal esteem between Müller and Foreign Minister Stresemann, who died on 3 October 1929. Relations between the parties were strained by the arguments over the construction of the pocket battleship Panzerkreuzer A, in which the SPD forced its ministers to vote against the allocation of funds to the project in the Reichstag even though they had endorsed it in cabinet meetings in order to keep the coalition intact. In addition, the Ruhr iron dispute (Ruhreisenstreit), the "largest and longest lockout Germany had ever experienced", was a bone of contention, as the DVP voted against the Reichstag motion that approved state support for the estimated 200,000 to 260,000 locked out workers.

Financing the budget for 1929 and the external liabilities of the Reich were huge problems, and reaching an agreement involved negotiating more lenient reparations conditions with the Allies. Müller had been the leader of the delegation to the League of Nations in the summer of 1928, where he – despite a heated argument with French Foreign Minister Aristide Briand over German rearmament – had laid the groundwork for concessions by the Allies. By January 1930, the government had succeeded in negotiating a reduction in reparation payments (the Young Plan, signed in August 1929) and a promise by the Allies to completely withdraw the occupation forces from the Rhineland by May 1930.

Meanwhile, Müller's cabinet also had to deal with diplomatic problems with Poland over trade and the position of ethnic minorities. German-Soviet relations also reached a nadir, as the Soviet government blamed the cabinet for violence between Communist demonstrators and the police in Berlin in May 1929. At that point, the middle-class parties were looking for ways to end the coalition with the SPD. The nationalist DNVP and Nazi Party failed to stop the Young Plan, an attempt to settle Germany's World War I reparations issues, via a referendum, and the coalition parties disagreed on the issue of funding unemployment insurance. Müller was unable to participate in the political arena for several months due to a life-threatening illness.

Although Müller was able to resume his duties in the fall of 1929, he was physically weakened and unable to control the centrifugal forces at work. The coalition finally fell apart in a disagreement about budgetary issues. After the onset of the Great Depression, the unemployment insurance system required frequent injections of taxpayer money by the Reich, but the parties could not agree on how to raise the funds. Müller was willing to accept a compromise offer by Heinrich Brüning of the Centre Party, but he was overruled by the SPD parliamentary group, which refused to make any further concessions. On the suggestion of his advisors, Reich President Hindenburg would not provide Müller's government with the emergency powers available under Article 48 of the Weimar Constitution, forcing Müller and his cabinet to resign on 27 March 1930.

A number of progressive reforms were implemented under Müller's last government. In 1928, nationwide state-controlled unemployment insurance was established, and midwives and people in the music profession became compulsorily insured under a pension scheme for non-manual workers in 1929. In February 1929, accident insurance coverage was extended to include 22 occupationally induced diseases. That same year, a special pension for unemployed persons at the age of 60 was introduced.

== Death ==
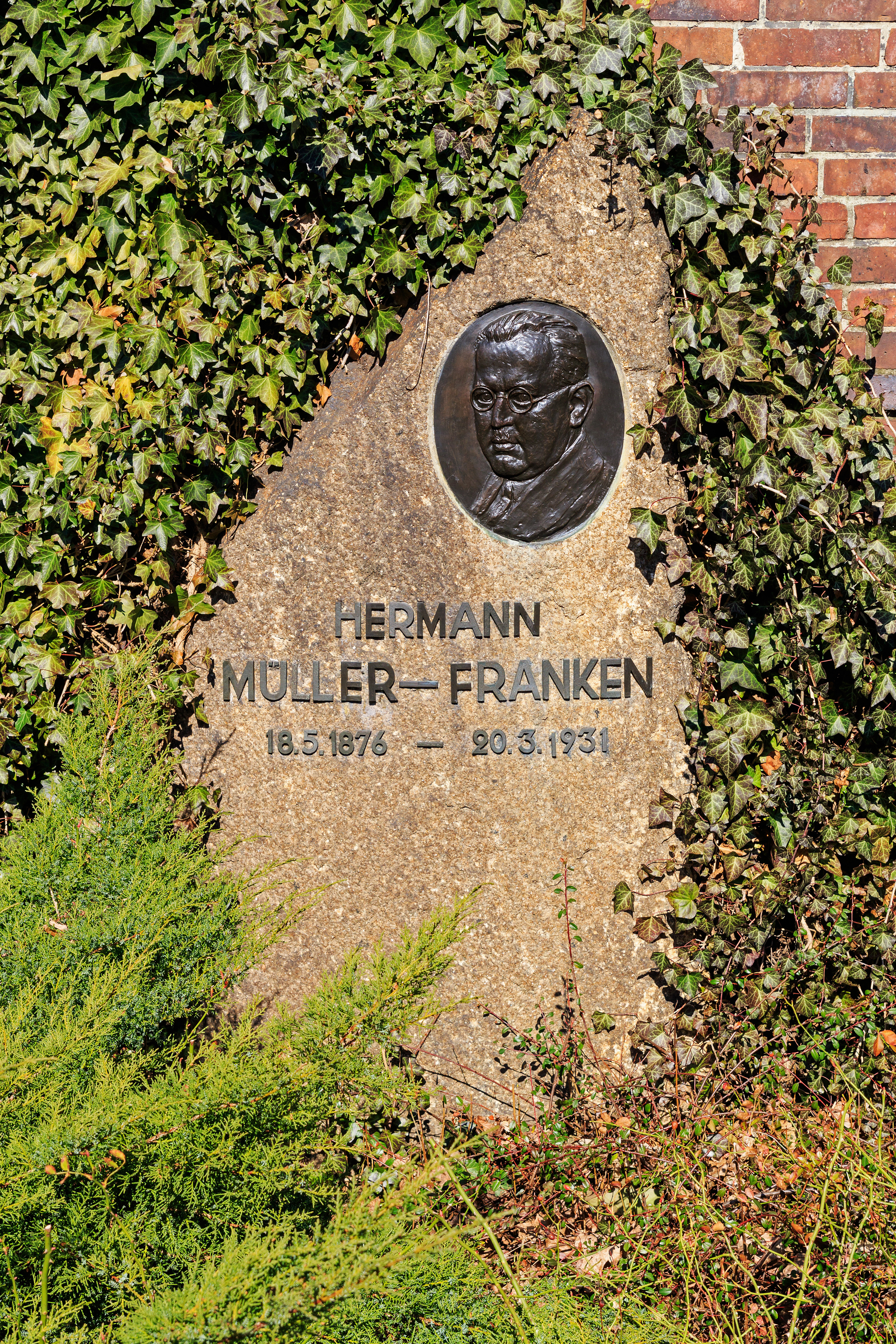
Müller's grave

After resigning as chancellor, Müller retired from public life. Following the elections in September 1930, which saw massive gains for Adolf Hitler's NSDAP, Müller called on his party to support Heinrich Brüning's government even without being part of the coalition. His death in 1931 following a gallbladder operation was seen as a major blow to the Social Democrats. He died in Berlin and is buried there at the Zentralfriedhof Friedrichsfelde.

== Family ==
In 1902, Müller married Frieda Tockus. They had one daughter, Annemarie, in 1905. Frieda died several weeks later due to complications from the pregnancy. He remarried in 1909 to Gottliebe Jaeger, and the following year, their daughter Erika was born.

== Works ==
- Müller, Hermann (1928). Die Novemberrevolution - Erinnerungen [The November Revolution – Recollections]. Berlin: Der Bücherkreis.

== Literature ==
- Martin Vogt (1997). "Müller, Hermann". Neue Deutsche Biographie (in German). Vol. 18. Berlin: Duncker & Humblot. pp. 410–414. (full text online).
- Prager, Eugen: "Hermann Müller und die Presse". In: Mitteilungen des Vereins Arbeiterpresse. Heft 312 (April 1931), pp. 1–2.
- Behring, Rainer: "Wegbereiter sozialdemokratischer Außenpolitik. Hermann Müller" [Trailblazer of Social Democratic Foreign Policy. Hermann Müller]. In: Frankfurter Allgemeine Zeitung, 26 April 2006, p. 8.
- Braun, Bernd: Die Reichskanzler der Weimarer Republik. Zwölf Lebensläufe in Bildern [The Reich Chancellors of the Weimar Republic. Twelve Biographies in Pictures]. Düsseldorf, 2011, ISBN 978-3-7700-5308-7, pp. 134–167.

Political offices
Preceded by Ulrich von Brockdorff-Rantzau	Minister of Foreign Affairs; 1919 – 1920	Succeeded by Adolf Köster
Preceded by Gustav Bauer	Chancellor of Germany; 1920	Succeeded by Constantin Fehrenbach
Preceded by Wilhelm Marx	Chancellor of Germany; 1928 – 1930	Succeeded by Heinrich Brüning
