= Hermann Lisco =

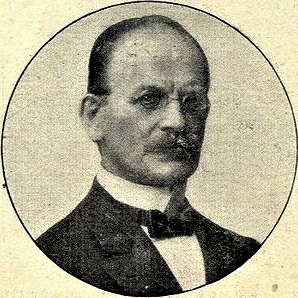
- Dr. Hermann Lisco, 1913

Secretary of Justice
- In office October 1909 – August 1917
- Chancellor: Theobald von Bethmann Hollweg

Personal details
- Born: 30 January 1850
- Died: 7 November 1923 (aged 73)
- Profession: Jurist

Gustav Amandus Hermann Lisco (30 January 1850 – 7 November 1923) was a German lawyer and government minister in the early 20th century.

== Biography ==
His father was Emil Gustav Lisco, a priest at the Berlin St. Marienkirche. Between 1859 and 1868 he attended the Friedrich Werder Gymnasium, after which he studied law in Berlin, Heidelberg and Greifswald. In 1872 he entered the Prussian judicial service.

Lisco became a magistrate in Rixdorf in 1879; in 1883 he became a provincial judge for Berlin; in 1888 he was named High Court Judge to Kwidzyn and one year later in the same function to Naumburg. In 1903 he became a privy councillor. The following year he became head of the personnel department of the Prussian Ministry of Justice in the rank of Ministerial Director. From 1907 to 1909 he was the head of the Berlin Kammergericht, then in 1909 he was appointed a minister of Justice, and then Secretary as Secretary of State in the Reichsjustizamt.

He was a member of the General Synod of the Prussian Union of churches from 1908, and president of the Evangelischer Bund in 1922/1923.

Hermann Lisco was buried in a family grave at the cemetery of the Jerusalems- und Neuen Kirche in Berlin-Kreuzberg. The grave is maintained.
