= Franz Stöhr =

Franz Stöhr (born 19 November 1879 in Veliká Ves (Chomutov District) – died 13 November 1938 in Schneidemühl) was a German politician with the Nazi Party.

Stöhr was a Sudeten German who had been active in antisemitic politics before the First World War.

Stöhr was elected as a member of the Reichstag for electoral constituency 12 (Thuringia) in the May 1924 election. Stöhr began as a member of the German Völkisch Freedom Party (DVFP) and was elected as part of the National Socialist Freedom Movement, an electoral pact between this group and the Nazis. However, in May 1927 Ernst Graf zu Reventlow split from the DVFP after becoming a strong admirer of Adolf Hitler and Stöhr joined the likes of Christian Mergenthaler and Wilhelm Kube in following Reventlow into the Nazi Party. From the election of May 1928 on, he ran as a candidate of the Nazi Party. Beginning with the election of September 1930, he switched to constituency 11 (Merseburg) and retained this seat until his death.

Stöhr was also a leading figure in the Deutschnationaler Handlungsgehilfen-Verband, a völkisch and antisemitic trade union for white-collar workers, close links with which had been cultivated by Gregor Strasser in the early 1930s. He was a shop-assistant by profession and thus of the petit-bourgeois stock that made up the bulk of Nazi Party support in the 1920s.
