= Early timeline of Nazism =

The early timeline of Nazism begins with its origins and continues until Hitler's rise to power.

== 19th century influences ==
- 1841: German economist Friedrich List publishes National System of Political Economy, espousing settlement farming and agricultural expansion eastwards along with economic industrialization manipulated by the state, and the establishment of a German-dominated European economic sphere as part of the solution to Germany's economic woes (predecessor ideas to Nazi imperialism).
- 1856: French aristocrat and author Arthur de Gobineau publishes his An Essay on the Inequality of the Human Races in which he divides the human species into three races, black, white, and yellow; arguing therein that racial distinctions form a clear and natural genetic barrier of sorts. Gobineau wrote that racial mixing would lead to chaos. While not an anti-Semite (he is often characterized as philosemitic, as he wrote positively about the Jews), his work is still considered an early manifestation of scientific racism. Historian Joachim C. Fest, in his biography of Hitler, claims that Arthur de Gobineau's negative views on race mixing influenced Hitler and thereby, the ideology of Nazism.
- 1870s: German chancellor Otto von Bismarck promotes campaigns against Catholics (Kulturkampf) and, later, against the Social Democratic Party, in an attempt to unify Germans in common opposition to a minority. Later referred to as "negative integration," historians cite it as setting a tone of exclusion in early Germany, which had a lasting influence on later German nationalism.
- 1882: The Linz Program, one of the most notable expressions of early German nationalism in Austria, is published. The program advocates a break with the Habsburg monarchy, the full Germanization of Austria and its annexation to Germany as a single nation.
- 1888: German jurist and international law reformer, Franz von Liszt argues that criminal characteristics are innate as opposed to being determined by a person's social environment and coins the term, Criminal Biology, a theory that would later influence Nazi anthropologists and racial hygiene proponents in their justification for sterilization and euthanasia.

== World War I ==
=== 1914 ===
- 28 July: World War I breaks out.
- 2 August: Adolf Hitler receives permission to enlist; joins the 16th Bavarian Reserve Infantry Regiment in Munich.
- 30 October: Adolf Hitler is transferred to regimental staff as a runner.
- 1 November: Adolf Hitler is promoted to Gefreiter, the equivalent of a senior private or corporal.

=== 1916 ===
- Eugenicist Madison Grant publishes The Passing of the Great Race, which promotes the genetic supremacy of the Nordic race while warning of its racial decline, a treatise quickly embraced by members of the German racial hygiene movement.

=== 1917 ===
- September: Pan-Germanic German Fatherland Party emerges under the leadership of Admiral Alfred von Tirpitz and Wolfgang Kapp, the party's co-founders. The infamous “stab-in-the-back myth” used by right-wing organizations as a political platform allegedly originated with this party.

=== 1918 ===
- March: Anton Drexler founded a branch of Free Workers' Committee for a Good Peace league in Munich.
- 17 July: Adolf Hitler saves the life of the 9th Company Commander.
- 4 August: Adolf Hitler awarded the Iron Cross, 1st Class.
- 13 October: Adolf Hitler gassed near Ypres.
- 3 November: Kiel mutiny triggered the German revolution.
- 7 November: 100,000 workers march on the Royal House of Wittelsbach. Kaiser Wilhelm II flees.
- 8 November: All 22 of Germany's lesser kings, princes, grand dukes, and ruling dukes have been deposed. Kaiser Wilhelm told to abdicate.
- 9 November: Emil Eichhorn, radical leftist of the Independent Socialists, leads an armed mob and seizes the HQ of Berlin; Kaiser Wilhelm consents to abdicate; Social Democrats demand government from Prince Max; Friedrich Ebert assumes the chancellery; First German Republic established.
- 11 November: World War I ends.
- 19 November: Hitler discharged from hospital at Pasewalk.
- 25 December: German first World War ex-servicemens' organization, Der Stahlhelm founded by former German Army reserve officer and industrialist Franz Seldte in Magdeburg.
- Mid-December: First modern Freikorps unit formed, the Maercker Volunteer Rifles.

=== 1919 ===
- January: Independent Socialists and Spartacist League staged large protests, known as the Spartacist uprising; sections of Berlin occupied; decision made for the National Assembly to meet in the city of Weimar instead of Berlin.
- 5 January: Anton Drexler, along with Dietrich Eckart, Karl Harrer, Gottfried Feder and Hermann Esser, founds the German Workers' Party (DAP) from the branch of "Free Workers' Committee for a Good Peace" league and the Political Workers' Circle in Munich.
- 10 January: Battle for Berlin begins; Counter-revolution with Freikorps takes crucial role.
- 13 January: Battle of Berlin ends.
- 15 January: Communist leaders Karl Liebknecht and Rosa Luxemburg are murdered by Freikorps officers
- March: Adolf Hitler finishes job of guarding Russian prisoners.
- 3 March: 2nd Battle for Berlin; Communists seize Berlin; Gustav Noske given executive power.
- 7 March: Communist Strike Committee withdraws proclamation and makes peace overtures to government.
- 10 March: Gustav Noske orders Peoples' Naval Division disbanded. Battle for Berlin has ended.
- 14 April: Freikorps suppress communists in Dresden.
- 16 April: "Battle" of the Bavarian government troops at Dachau; Communists defeat Republican forces.
- 18 April: Freikorps suppress communists in Brunswick.
- 27 April: Battle for Munich occurs between Communists and Freikorps units.
- 2 May: City of Munich taken; not declared secure until 6 May; approximately 1200 Communists killed.
- 10 May: Freikorps suppress communists in Leipzig.
- 22 June: German Reichstag ratifies the Versailles Treaty.
- 28 June: Versailles Treaty signed in the Hall of Mirrors (Palace of Versailles).

== Weimar Republic ==
=== 1919 ===
- 12 August 1919: The Weimar Constitution is announced.
- 12 September 1919: Adolf Hitler attends a meeting of the German Workers' Party (DAP) in the Sterneckerbräu in Munich and joins the party as its 55th member. In less than a week, Hitler received a postcard stating he had officially been accepted as a party member.
- 16 October 1919: Hitler's first pre-arranged public speech as a member of the DAP takes place in the Hofbräukeller.
- Late fall: Freikorps fight the Red Army in the Baltic, eventually retreat in chaos; first Silesian uprising, in which many Freikorps see combat.

=== 1920 ===
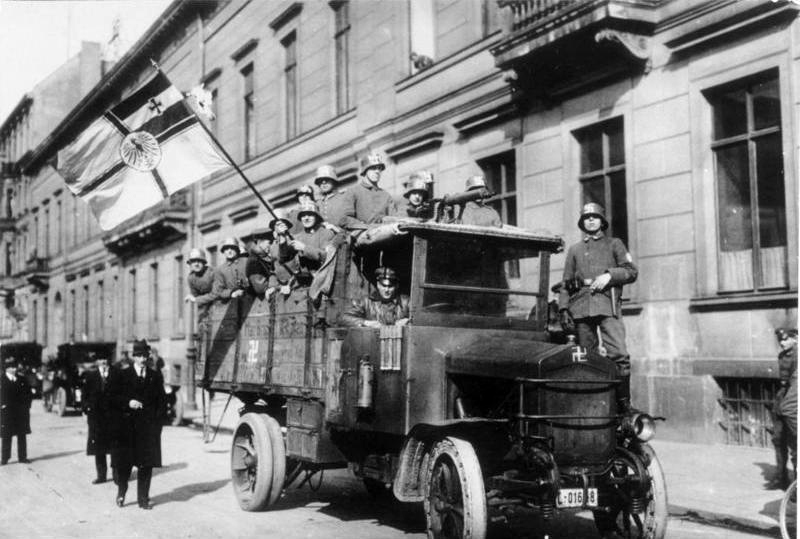
Kapp Putsch. Note the swastikas

- Many Freikorps were disbanded. Some go underground, to reappear later.
- January: The DAP grows to 190 members.
- February: Inter-Allied Control Commission order 2/3 of Freikorps disbanded.
- 24 February: DAP changes its name to National Socialist German Workers' Party (NSDAP). The party announces its programme in the Hofbräuhaus, known as the "25 points."
- 13 to 17 March: Kapp Putsch
- 31 March: Adolf Hitler mustered out of the army.
- April: Government stops paying Freikorps units.
- 3 April: 21 different Freikorps units, under the command of General Baron Oskar von Watter, end the Ruhr Uprising in five days; thousands killed, including summary execution of prisoners by Freikorps.
- 10 May: Dr. Joseph Wirth and Walter Rathenau announce their "Policy of Fulfillment"; not received well by nationalist groups.
- 8 August: Official founding date of the NSDAP
- 11 August: National Disarmament Law takes effect; disbands civil guards.
- 19 to 25 August: Second Silesian uprising, German Freikorps see more combat.
- 17 December: NSDAP buys its first paper, the Völkischer Beobachter.
- 31 December: NSDAP party membership was recorded at 2000.

=== 1921 ===
- Third Silesian uprising; German forces see more combat.
- Hermann Erhardt forms Organisation Consul, a paramilitary group, out of former members of his banned Freikorps.
- Eugen Fischer, Erwin Baur, and Fritz Lenz publish the standard work of German racialism, Human Hereditary Teaching and Racial Hygiene, a work which served as a basis for the Nazi racial hygiene policies and their euthanasia campaign.
- February 1921: highly effective at speaking to large audiences – Hitler spoke to a crowd of over 6,000 in Munich.
- 28 July: Adolf Hitler is elected chairman of the NSDAP with only one dissenting vote. Executive Committee of the party is dissolved. Party Founder Anton Drexler is made "Honorary Chairman" and resigns from the party soon after. Hitler soon begins to refer to himself as "Führer" (Leader).
- August 1921: NSDAP party membership was recorded at 3,300.

=== 1922 ===
- Prototype versions of the Hitler Youth form.
- The Prussian State Health Commission for Racial Hygiene works to centralise the institute's research concerning the practical application of racial hygiene, eugenics and anthropology.
- 12 January: Adolf Hitler sentenced to three months for disturbance of 14 September 1921.
- 24 June: Hitler incarcerated; German Foreign Minister Walther Rathenau assassinated, some involved are in the Organisation Consul.
- July: Inflation hits the German economy: 670 RM = 1 US$
- 27 July: Hitler released.
- August: 2,000 RM = US$1
- October: 4,500 RM = US$1
- 28 October: Benito Mussolini establishes his Fascist dictatorship in Italy.
- November: 10,000 RM = US$1
- 22 November: Dr. Wirth leaves office
- 16 December: The German Völkisch Freedom Party (DVFP) was founded when Wilhelm Henning, Reinhold Wulle and Albrecht von Graefe broke from the German National People's Party (DNVP).

=== 1923 ===
- 11 January: French and Belgian troops occupy the Ruhr after Germany is declared in default in its World War I reparations.
- 28 January: First Nazi Party Day held under the slogan Germany Awake in Munich.
- February: Reichsbank buys back RM; stabilizes RM at 20,000 to US$1
- 4 May: RM 40,000 = US$1
- 27 May: Albert Leo Schlageter, a German freebooter and saboteur, executed by a French firing squad in the Ruhr. Hitler declared him a hero that the German people was not worthy to possess.
- 1 June: RM 70,000 = US$1
- 30 June: RM 150,000 = US$1
- 1–7 August: Inflation became hyperinflation: RM 3,500,000 = US$1
- 13 August: Dr. Wilhelm Cuno leaves office
- 15 August: RM 4,000,000 = US$1
- 1 September: RM 10,000,000 = US$1
- 1–2 September: German Day Rally takes place in Nuremberg and the Deutscher Kampfbund is formed.
- 24 September: Chancellor Gustav Stresemann ends the passive resistance in the Ruhr; infuriates the nationalists.
- 25 September: Hitler is made political leader of the Kampfbund.
- 30 September: Major Fedor von Bock crushes a coup attempt by the Black Reichswehr. RM 60,000,000 = US$1
- 6 October: Stresemann forms his 2nd cabinet
- 11 October: Ernst Röhm forms the Bund Reichskriegsflagge and brings it into the Kampfbund.
- 20 October: General Alfred Mueller marches on Saxony to prevent a communist takeover. General Otto von Lossow in Bavaria is relieved of command by Berlin; he refuses to cmoply.
- 23 October: Communist takeover of Hamburg
- 25 October: Hamburg uprising suppressed
- 8 November: Hitler and Erich Ludendorff launch the Beer Hall Putsch in the Bürgerbräukeller in Munich.
- 9 November: Beer Hall Putsch quelled.

=== 1924 ===
- 26 February: Hitler Putsch trial begins.
- 1 April: Hitler sentenced to five-years at Landsberg prison. From here, Hitler writes Mein Kampf with the assistance of Rudolf Hess
- 28 October: France officially recognizes the Soviet Union, alarming German conservatives in the process.
- 20 December: Hitler released from the Landsberg Prison.

=== 1925 ===
- 21 January: Japan recognizes the U.S.S.R.
- 16 February 1925: Bavaria lifts ban on NSDAP.
- 27 February 1925: The Nazi Party (NSDAP) is refounded.
- 9 Mar 1925: Bavaria bans Hitler from public speaking.
- 7 July: French troops withdraw from the German Rhineland.
- 14 July: Allied evacuation of the Ruhr valley begins.
- 18 July 1925: Vol. 1 of Hitler's Mein Kampf released.
- July–August: Germans are forced to leave Poland and Poles are expedited out of Germany in disputed territories.
- 11 November: The Schutzstaffel (SS) paramilitary unit is created as a praetorian guard for Hitler's protection.
- 27 November: Locarno Treaties ratified by Reichstag.

=== 1926 ===
- 3 & 4 July: Nazi Party "Re-founding Congress" takes place in Weimar

=== 1927 ===
- 5 March: Hitler speaking ban lifted in Bavaria.
- 17 August: Franco-German commercial treaty signed.
- 20 August: "Day of Awakening" celebrated in Nuremberg

=== 1928 ===
- 20 March: NSDAP gains 2.6% of the vote in Reichstag elections.
- 28 September: Prussia lifts Hitler speaking ban.
- 20 October: Alfred Hugenberg becomes head of DNVP
- 16 November: Hitler first speaks at Berlin Sportpalast, Germany's largest venue.

=== 1929 ===
- January: Heinrich Himmler appointed chief of the SS. He begins to transform it into a powerful organization
- 2 August: "Party Day of Composure" occurs in Nuremberg
- 16 October: Liberty Law campaign officially begins. The Nazi Party joins a coalition of conservative groups under Hugenberg's leadership to oppose the Young Plan.
- 22 December: The Liberty Law referendum is defeated. Hitler denounces Hugenberg's leadership parlance.

=== 1930 ===
- September: Hitler at trial of 3 SA Lieutenants disavows the SA goals of replacing the army and hence appeases the army.
- 14 September: In a milestone election, Nazis gain 6 million votes in national polling to emerge as the second largest party in Germany.

=== 1931 ===
- 11 May: Austrian Kreditanstalt collapses
- May: Four million unemployed in Germany.
- 20 June: Herbert Hoover puts moratorium on reparations.
- 13 July: German bank crisis.
- 18 September: Geli Raubal dies.
- 11 October: Harzburg Front formed of coalition between DNVP, Stahlhelm, and Nazi Party. Himmler recruits Reinhard Heydrich to form the Ic-Dienst (intelligence service) within the SS; later in 1932 it was renamed the Sicherheitsdienst (SD).
- December: Unemployment reaches 5.6 million in Germany; people become more and more disillusioned with the German government.

=== 1932 ===
- 13 March: Hitler convincingly defeated by Hindenburg in first round of German presidential election.
- 10 April: Hindenburg re-elected Reichspräsident in run-off election with 53% of the vote. Hitler gains 37% and the Communist candidate Thälmann gains 10.2%.
- 13 April: The SA and SS are banned by Chancellor Brüning.
- 30 May: Chancellor Brüning (Center) leaves office and is replaced by Franz von Papen.
- 1 June: Papen cabinet formed.
- 16 June: Papen lifts the ban on the SA and SS.
- 16 June – 9 July: Lausanne Conference takes place.
- 17 July: Altona Bloody Sunday. Violent clashes between the police, the SA and Communist Party supporters.
- 20 July: "Preußenschlag": Papen uses emergency decree to dissolve Prussian government of Otto Braun and takes over as Reichskommissar.
- 31 July: Reichstag election: Nazi Party becomes the largest with 13.7 million votes (37.3%) and 230 out of 608 seats.
- 9 August: Konrad Piecuch, a Polish communist activist who took part in Silesian Uprisings against German rule is murdered in Germany by SA; Hitler defends the murderers in German press.
- 6 November: Reichstag election: Nazi Party loses ground with 11.7 million votes (33.1%) and 196 out of 584 seats.
- 17 November: Papen resigns but stays on as head of a caretaker cabinet.
- 2 December: Reichswehr General Kurt von Schleicher becomes Chancellor.
- 8 December: Following a major dispute with Hitler over whether to join government, Gregor Strasser resigns his Party offices.

== Nazi Germany ==
Chart: The political system of Germany in 1935, two years into the Nazi dictatorship

=== 1933 ===
- 4 January: Secret meeting between Hitler and Papen occurs.
- 23 January: Schleicher resigns as Chancellor.
- 30 January: President Hindenburg appoints Hitler chancellor of a Nazi-DNVP coalition.
- 1 February: Dissolution of the Reichstag.
- 2 February: Hitler meets with top military leaders, describes his plans to rearm Germany.
- 17 February: Prussian Interior Ministry permits the shooting of "enemies of the state" under the direction of Hermann Göring.
- 20 February: Secret Meeting between Adolf Hitler, and 20 to 25 industrialists to raise funds for the election campaign of the Nazi Party.
- 27 February: Reichstag fire occurs. It was officially blamed on Marinus van der Lubbe, a communist.
- 28 February: Hitler awarded emergency powers under the presidential decree, Law for the Protection of People and State ("Reichstag Fire Decree"), the process of exerting totalitarian control over Germany, begins. Over the next five months, the Nazis systematically force all opposition political parties to shut down.
- 5 March: Reichstag Election results in slim majority for Hitler's coalition, though not a majority for the Nazi Party, which polls 17.2 million votes (43.9%) and wins 288 seats.
- 9 March: Heinrich Himmler becomes Police President in Munich.
- 13 March: Joseph Goebbels named Reich Minister of Public Enlightenment and Propaganda.
- 16 March: Hjalmar Schacht takes over the role of President of the Reichsbank from Hans Luther.
- 17 March: Sepp Dietrich assumes command of Hitler's body guard, the Leibstandarte Adolf Hitler.
- 22 March: Dachau concentration camp opens, begins receiving political prisoners. First Nazi "racial hygiene" office established in the Interior Ministry.
- 24 March: Enabling Act, passed with help of Catholic Center Party, effectively hands the legislative powers of the Reichstag over to the Chancellor for a period of four years. Act permits Chancellor and cabinet to issue laws without a vote of Parliament and to deviate from the Constitution. Process of Gleichschaltung begins.
- 31 March: "Provisional Law on the Coordination of the States with the Reich" dissolves sitting Landtage and reconstitutes them based on the results of the Reichstag election, giving Nazi/DNVP coalition control of all state parliaments.
- 1 April: One day boycott of Jewish shops. Himmler is appointed police commander of Bavaria.
- 7 April: "Law for the Restoration of the Professional Civil Service" – Jewish and Communist inclined workers from the Civil Service purged, around 5% removed in total. "Second Law on the Coordination of the States with the Reich" – Reichsstatthalter (Nazi Governors) appointed to rule in the German states. Effective end of federalism.
- 11 April: Hitler appoints Hermann Göring Minister-President and Interior Minister of Prussia. Papen resigns as Reichskommissar.
- 21 April: Kosher slaughter outlawed
- 26 April: Göring forms the Gestapo (Secret State Police) in the state of Prussia.
- 2 May: Trade union offices are stormed by the SA and closed down. Leaders are arrested, publications are shut down and assets are seized.
- 10 May: German Labour Front, headed by Robert Ley, is created to replace trade unions.
- 10 May: A large number of Nazi book burnings takes place across Germany.
- 18 May: Landtag of Prussia meets for the last time and passes an "enabling act" vesting legislative authority in Göring's government.
- 19 May: "Law on the Trustees of Labour" establishes Trustees of Labour, Reich officials who regulate labour relations. Their legally binding decisions replace collective bargaining.
- 23 May: Hitler visits Kiel Harbor to see the fleet consisting of the old pre-dreadnought battleships Schlesien, Hessen, and Schleswig-Holstein and the light cruisers Karlsruhe, Königsberg, and Leipzig. He boards Leipzig with leading SS and government officials including General Werner von Blomberg, Admiral Erich Raeder, Hermann Göring, and Franz von Papen.
- 6 July: At a gathering of high-ranking Nazi officials, Hitler declares the success of the National Socialist, or Nazi revolution.
- 11 July: The law of 8 July dissolving the second chamber of the Prussian legislature, the Prussian State Council, and creating a reconstituted Prussian State Council as an advisory, non-legislative body comes into effect. The Council President is Hermann Göring and it holds its first session on 15 September.
- 14 July: "Law Against the Formation of Parties" proclaims the Nazi Party "the only political party in Germany" and all others are banned. The Reich Chamber of Film is established by the "Law for the Establishment of a Temporary Film Chamber."
- 20 July: Reichskonkordat signed with Holy See. Violations by Germany begin immediately.
- 22 September: The Reich Chamber of Culture is established with Joseph Goebbels becoming its figurehead. It oversees seven chambers, including the Reich Chamber of Music.
- 14 October: Germany officially withdraws from the League of Nations. The Reichstag is dissolved and an election is scheduled for 12 November. Also, all state Landtage are dissolved but no elections are scheduled.
- 9 November: Freikorps symbolically pledge allegiance to Hitler in a huge ceremony.
- 12 November: Reichstag election results in the Nazis polling 39.6 million votes (92.1%) and winning all 661 seats in the new single-party state.
- 27 November: Strength through Joy program established.
- 30 November: The Gestapo, which had only previously existed in Prussia is given authority throughout Germany.
- November: As part of the "war on drugs", the Reichstag passes a law allowing the imprisonment of drug addicts for up to two years, a period that could be extended indefinitely by legal decree.
- 1 December: "Law to Secure the Unity of Party and State" is enacted, making the Nazi Party a public corporation. Party courts were made official legal institutions of the State and any crime committed against the Party now was a crime against the State. Police, public prosecutors and courts were obligated to provide the Party and the SA with administrative and legal information and investigatory assistance.
- Fall: Hitler reveals to his close associates a plan to annex Western Poland and create a ring of puppet states around Germany without any policies of their own

=== 1934 ===
- 30 January: "Law on the Reconstruction of the Reich" formally abolishes the Landtage of the German states and transfers states' sovereignty to the Reich. Formally ends federalism in Germany.
- 14 February: "Law on the Abolition of the Reichsrat" formally abolishes the Reichsrat, the upper house of the German parliament.
- 11 April: Pact of the Deutschland: Hitler persuades the top officials of the army and navy to back his bid to succeed Hindenburg as president, by promising to "diminish" the three-million-man-plus SA and greatly expand the regular army and navy.
- 20 April: The Gestapo is transferred from Göring to Himmler and Heydrich, who begin to integrate it into the SS.
- 16 May: German officer corps endorses Hitler to succeed the ailing President Hindenburg.
- 17 June: Reich Minister of Justice Franz Gürtner also becomes Prussian Minister of Justice, uniting positions in a dual mandate.
- 30 June – 2 July: Night of the Long Knives or Blood Purge: On pretext of suppressing an alleged SA putsch, much of the brownshirt leadership, including Ernst Röhm, are arrested and executed. Kurt von Schleicher, Gregor Strasser and other political enemies are murdered. Papen briefly imprisoned; between 150 and 200 were killed. The SS, formerly part of the SA, now comes to the forefront.
- 13 July: Defending the purge, Hitler declares that to defend Germany he has the right to act unilaterally as "supreme judge" without resort to courts.
- 2 August: President Hindenburg dies. The previous day, the cabinet had enacted the "Law Concerning the Head of State of the German Reich". This law stated that upon Hindenburg's death, the office of Reich President would be abolished and its powers merged with those of the Chancellor. The decree is illegal but goes unchallenged. The armed forces swear a new oath to Hitler, personally.
- 19 August: The German people in a plebiscite overwhelmingly (90%) approve merger of the offices of President and Chancellor. Hitler assumes the new title of Führer und Reichskanzler (leader and Reich chancellor). He is now the head of state, the head of government and the commander-in-chief of the armed forces.
- 1 November: The Prussian and Reich Interior Ministries are combined under Wilhelm Frick.
- 4 December: State ministries of justice are eliminated and all judicial functionaries report to Reich Ministry of Justice under Franz Gürtner.

== See also ==
- Hitler's rise to power
- Weimar Republic
