= Albrecht von Graefe =

Albrecht von Graefe may refer to:

- Albrecht von Graefe (ophthalmologist) (1828-1870), Prussian ophthalmologist
- Albrecht von Graefe (politician) (1868-1933), German politician and landowner
