= 1924 German federal election =

The 1924 German federal election may refer to:

- May 1924 German federal election
- December 1924 German federal election
