= Demagogue =

Politician or orator who panders to fears and emotions of the public

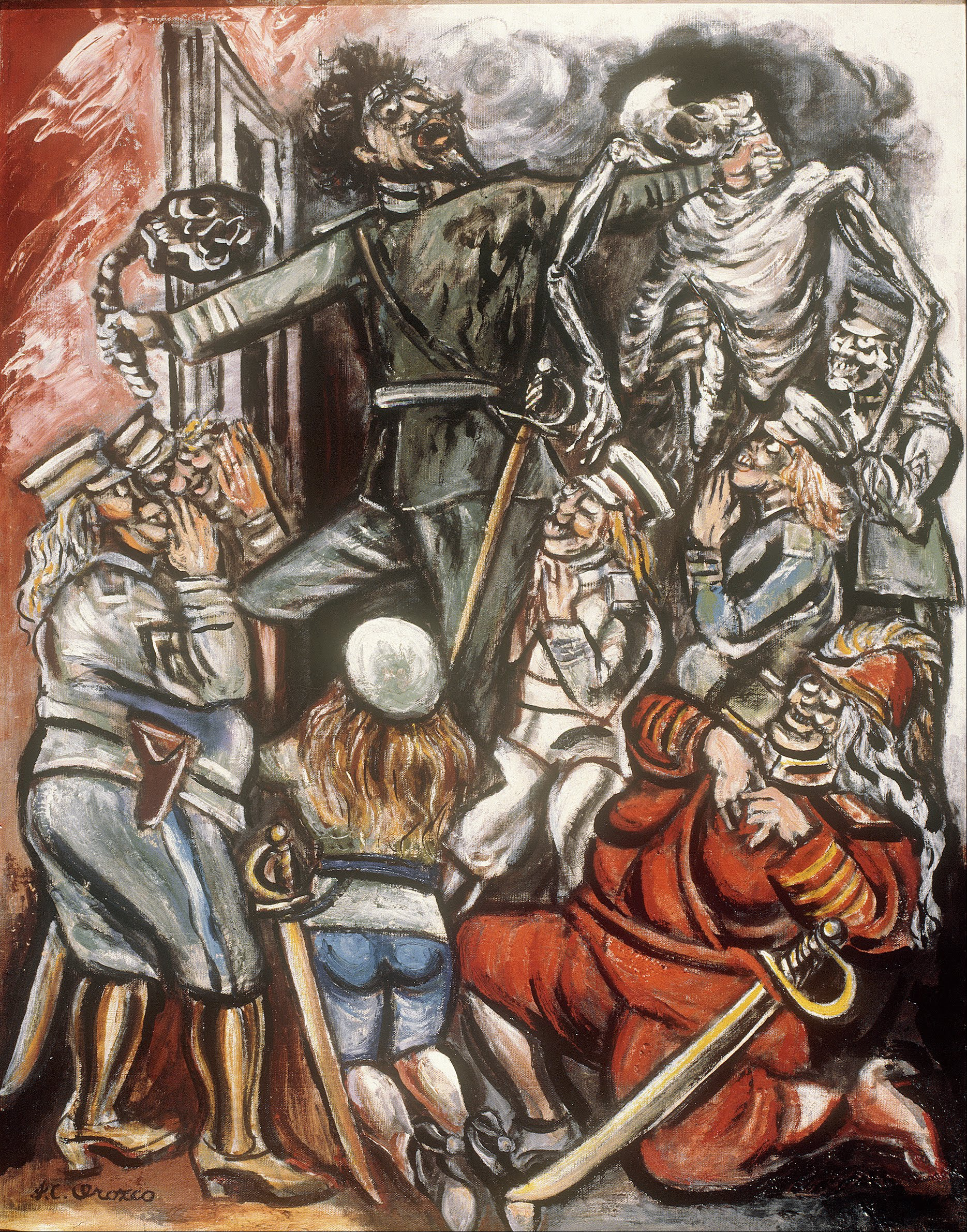
José Clemente Orozco's painting The Demagogue, 1946

A demagogue (/ˈdɛməˌɡɒɡ/; from Ancient Greek δημαγωγός (dēmagōgós) 'popular leader, mob leader'; from Ancient Greek δῆμος (dêmos) 'people, populace' and ἀγωγός (agōgós) 'leading, guiding'), or rabble-rouser, is a political leader in a democracy who gains popularity by arousing the common people against elites, especially through oratory that whips up the passions of crowds, appealing to emotion by scapegoating out-groups, exaggerating dangers to stoke fears, lying for emotional effect, or other rhetoric that tends to drown out reasoned deliberation and encourage fanatical popularity. Demagogues overturn established norms of political conduct, or promise or threaten to do so.

Historian Reinhard Luthin defined demagogue as "a politician skilled in oratory, flattery and invective; evasive in discussing vital issues; promising everything to everybody; appealing to the passions rather than the reason of the public; and arousing racial, religious, and class prejudices—a man whose lust for power without recourse to principle leads him to seek to become a master of the masses. He has for centuries practiced his profession of 'man of the people'. He is a product of a political tradition nearly as old as western civilization itself."

Demagogues have appeared in democracies since ancient Athens. Because ultimate power is held by the people, it is possible for them to give it to someone who appeals to the lowest common denominator of a large segment of the population. Demagogues have usually advocated immediate, forceful action to address a crisis while accusing moderate and thoughtful opponents of weakness or disloyalty. Many demagogues elected to high executive office have unraveled constitutional limits on executive power and tried to convert their democracy into a dictatorship, sometimes successfully.

== History and definition of the word ==
A demagogue, in the strict signification of the word, is a 'leader of the rabble'.

— James Fenimore Cooper, "On Demagogues" (1838)

Demagogue, a term originally referring to a leader of the common people, was first coined in ancient Greece with no negative connotation, but eventually came to mean a troublesome kind of leader who occasionally arose in Athenian democracy. Even though democracy gave power to the common people, elections still tended to favor the aristocratic class, which favored deliberation and decorum. Demagogues were a new kind of leader who emerged from the lower classes. Demagogues relentlessly advocated action, usually violent—immediately and without deliberation.

The term "demagogue" has been used to disparage leaders perceived as manipulative, pernicious, or bigoted. However, what distinguishes a demagogue can be defined independently of whether the speaker favors or opposes a certain political leader. A demagogue is defined by how they gain or hold democratic power: by exciting the passions of the lower classes and less-educated people in a democracy toward rash or violent action and breaking established democratic institutions such as the rule of law. James Fenimore Cooper in 1838 identified four fundamental characteristics of demagogues:

- They present themselves as a man or woman of the common people, opposed to the elites.
- Their politics depends on a visceral connection with the people, which greatly exceeds ordinary political popularity.
- They manipulate this connection, and the raging popularity it affords, for their own benefit and ambition.
- They threaten or outright break established rules of conduct, institutions, and even the law.

Their methods are known as demagoguery or demagogy. The central feature of demagoguery is persuasion by means of passion, shutting down reasoned deliberation and consideration of alternatives. While many politicians in a democracy make occasional small sacrifices of truth, subtlety, or long-term concerns to maintain popular support, demagogues do these things relentlessly and without self-restraint. Demagogues "pander to passion, prejudice, bigotry, and ignorance, rather than reason."

The Austrian philosopher of language and political scientist Paul Sailer-Wlasits differentiates between populism and demagoguery, asserting that "[a] central aspect that distinguishes populism from demagoguery is that demagogues in politics possess substantial systemic power for mobilization, which poses a serious threat to democracy." In political practice, he argues, a clear indication of demagoguery is when "the person, the party, and the political program merge, manifesting as over-identification and over-personalization in a single leading figure."

== History and characteristics of demagogues ==
In every age the vilest specimens of human nature are to be found among demagogues.

— Thomas Macaulay, The History of England from the Accession of James II (1849)

Demagogues have risen to power in democracies from Athens to the present day. While many demagogues have unique, colorful personalities, the psychological tactics they use have been similar throughout history (see below).

Often considered the first demagogue, Cleon of Athens is remembered mainly for the brutality of his rule and his near destruction of Athenian democracy, resulting from his "common-man" appeal to disregard the moderate customs of the aristocratic elite. Modern demagogues include Adolf Hitler, Benito Mussolini, Huey Long, Father Coughlin, and Joseph McCarthy, all of whom built mass followings the same way that Cleon did: by exciting the passions of the masses against customs and norms of the aristocratic elites of their times. All, ancient and modern, meet Cooper's four criteria above: claiming to represent the common people, inciting intense passions among them, exploiting those reactions to take power, and breaking or at least threatening established rules of political conduct, though each in different ways.

Demagogues have often exploited the lower classes and less-educated people in society. While democracies are designed to ensure freedom for all and popular control over government authority, demagogues gain power by using popular support to undermine those same freedoms and laws. The Greek historian Polybius thought that democracies are inevitably undone by demagogues. He said that every democracy eventually decays into "a government of violence and the strong hand", leading to "tumultuous assemblies, massacres, banishments".

While conventional wisdom positions democracy and fascism as opposites, ancient political theorists understood that democracy had an innate tendency to lead to an extreme populist government and provide demagogues with an ideal opportunity to gain power. Ivo Mosley argued that totalitarian regimes may be the logical outcome of unfettered mass democracy.

=== Emotional oratory and personal charisma ===
Many demagogues have demonstrated remarkable skill at moving audiences to great emotional depths and heights during a speech. Sometimes this is due to exceptional verbal eloquence, sometimes personal charisma, and sometimes both.

Hitler often began his speeches by speaking slowly, in a low, resonant voice, telling of his life in poverty after serving in World War I, suffering in the chaos and humiliation of postwar Germany, and resolving to reawaken the Fatherland. Gradually, he would escalate the tone and tempo of his speech, ending in a climax in which he expressed his hatred of groups he currently perceived as standing in his way—mocking them, ridiculing them, insulting them, and threatening them with destruction. Hitler was not born with these vocal and oratorical skills; he acquired them through long and deliberate practice.

A more ordinary silver-tongued demagogue was James Kimble Vardaman (Governor of Mississippi 1904–1908, Senator 1913–1919), admired even by his opponents for his oratorical gifts and colorful language. An example, responding to Theodore Roosevelt's having invited black people to a reception at the White House: "Let Teddy take coons to the White House. I should not care if the walls of the ancient edifice should become so saturated with the effluvia from the rancid carcasses that a Chinch bug would have to crawl upon the dome to avoid asphyxiation."

== Tactics ==
There are a number of common tactics demagogues have employed throughout history to manipulate public sentiment and incite crowds. Not all demagogues use all of these methods, and no two demagogues use exactly the same methods to gain popularity and loyalty. Even ordinary politicians use some of these techniques from time to time; a politician who failed to stir emotions at all would have little hope of being elected. What these techniques have in common, and what distinguishes demagogues' use of them, is their consistent intent to prevent reasoned deliberation by stirring up overwhelming passion.

In contrast to a demagogue, a politician's ordinary rhetoric seeks "to calm rather than excite, to conciliate rather than divide, and to instruct rather than flatter."

=== Scapegoating ===
The most fundamental demagogic technique is scapegoating: blaming the in-group's troubles on an out-group, usually of a different ethnicity, religion, or social class. For example, McCarthy claimed that all of the problems of the U.S. resulted from "communist subversion." Denis Kearney blamed all the problems of laborers in California on Chinese immigrants. Hitler blamed Jews for Germany's defeat in World War I as well as the economic troubles that came afterward. This was central to his appeal: many people said that the only reason they liked Hitler was because he was against the Jews. Fixing blame on the Jews gave Hitler a way to intensify nationalism and unity.

The claims made about the scapegoated class are mostly the same regardless of the demagogue and regardless of the scapegoated class or the nature of the crisis that the demagogue is exploiting. "We" are the "true" Americans/Germans/Christians/etc., and "they", the Jews/bankers/communists/capitalists/unions/foreigners/elites/etc., have cheated "us" plain folk and are living in decadent luxury off riches that rightfully belong to "us". "They" are plotting to take over, are now rapidly taking power, or are already secretly running the country. "They" are subhuman, sexual perverts who will seduce or rape "our" daughters, and if "we" do not expel or exterminate "them" right away, doom is just around the corner.

=== Fearmongering ===
Many demagogues have risen to power by evoking fear in their audiences, to stir them to action and prevent deliberation. Fear of rape, for example, is easily evoked. "Pitchfork Ben" Tillman's rhetoric was most vivid when he was describing imaginary scenes in which white women were raped by black men lurking by the side of the road. He depicted black men as having an innate "character weakness" consisting of a fondness for raping white women. Tillman was elected governor of South Carolina in 1890, and elected senator repeatedly from 1895 to 1918.

After the September 11 attacks in the United States, terrorism and national security became prominent political issues. After Democrats lost control of the Congress in 2004, former U.S. president Bill Clinton opined: "When people are feeling insecure, they'd rather have someone who is strong and wrong rather than somebody who is weak and right." The Clinton aphorism was later applied to describe why the political tactics of Donald Trump were successful, and how Democrats might do better in related elections.

=== Lying ===
Demagogues typically choose their words for their emotional effect on the audience, often without regard for factual truth or for potential danger. Demagogues are opportunistic, saying whatever will generate controversy and spur public energy. Other demagogues may believe falsehoods they tell.

If one lie does not work, a demagogue often adds more lies. Joseph McCarthy claimed to have a list of 205 members of the Communist Party working in the State Department. Then, he announced there were 57 "card-carrying Communists". When pressed for names, McCarthy said that records were not available to him, but he knew "absolutely" that "approximately" 300 Communists were certified to the Secretary of State for discharge but "approximately" 80 were actually discharged. McCarthy never found a Communist in the State Department.

=== Accusing opponents of weakness and disloyalty ===
Cleon of Athens, like many demagogues who came after him, constantly advocated brutality in order to demonstrate strength, and argued that compassion was a sign of weakness that would only be exploited by enemies. "It is a general rule of human nature that people despise those who treat them well and look up to those who make no concessions." At the Mytilenian Debate over whether to recall the ships he had sent the previous day to slaughter and enslave the entire population of Mytilene, he opposed the very idea of debate, characterizing it as an idle, weak, intellectual pleasure: "To feel pity, to be carried away by the pleasure of hearing a clever argument, to listen to the claims of decency are three things that are entirely against the interests of an imperial power."

Distracting from his lack of evidence for his claims, Joe McCarthy persistently insinuated that anyone who opposed him was a communist sympathizer. G.M. Gilbert summarized this rhetoric as "I'm agin' Communism; you're agin' me; therefore you must be a communist."

=== Promising the impossible ===
Another fundamental demagogic technique is making promises only for their emotional effect on audiences, without regard for how they might be accomplished or without intending to honor them once in office. Demagogues express these empty promises simply and theatrically, but remain extremely hazy about how they will achieve them because usually they are impossible. For example, Huey Long promised that if he were elected president, every family would have a home, an automobile, a radio, and $2,000 yearly. He was vague about how he would make that happen, but people still joined his Share-the-Wealth clubs. Another kind of empty demagogic promise is to make everyone wealthy or "solve all the problems". The Polish demagogue Stanisław Tymiński, running as an unknown "maverick" on the basis of his prior success as a businessman in Canada, promised "immediate prosperity"—exploiting the economic difficulties of laborers, especially miners and steelworkers. Tymiński forced a runoff in the 1990 presidential election, nearly defeating Lech Wałęsa.

=== Encouraging violence and using physical intimidation ===
Demagogues have often encouraged their supporters to violently intimidate opponents, both to solidify loyalty among their supporters and to discourage or physically prevent people from speaking out or voting against them. "Pitchfork Ben" Tillman was repeatedly re-elected to the U.S. Senate largely through violence and intimidation. He spoke in support of lynch mobs, and he disenfranchised most black voters with the South Carolina constitution of 1895. Hitler wrote in Mein Kampf that physical intimidation was an effective way to move the masses. Hitler intentionally provoked hecklers at his rallies so that his supporters would become enraged by their remarks and assault them.

=== Personal insults and ridicule ===
Many demagogues have found that ridiculing or insulting opponents is a simple way to shut down reasoned deliberation of competing ideas, especially with an unsophisticated audience. "Pitchfork Ben" Tillman, for example, was a master of the personal insult. He got his nickname from a speech in which he called President Grover Cleveland "an old bag of beef" and resolved to bring a pitchfork to Washington to "poke him in his old fat ribs." James Kimble Vardaman consistently referred to President Theodore Roosevelt as a "coon-flavored miscegenationist" and once posted an ad in a newspaper for "sixteen big, fat, mellow, rancid coons" to sleep with Roosevelt during a trip to Mississippi.

A common demagogic technique is to pin an insulting epithet on an opponent, by saying it repeatedly, in speech after speech, when saying the opponent's name or in place of it. For example, James Curley referred to Henry Cabot Lodge Jr., his Republican opponent for Senator, as "Little Boy Blue". William Hale Thompson called Anton Cermak, his opponent for mayor of Chicago, "Tony Baloney". Huey Long called Joseph E. Ransdell, his elderly opponent for Senator, "Old Feather Duster". Joe McCarthy liked to call Secretary of State Dean Acheson "The Red Dean of Fashion". The use of epithets and other humorous invective diverts followers' attention from soberly considering how to address the important public issues of the time, scoring easy laughs instead.

=== Exhibiting vulgarity and behaving outrageously ===
Legislative bodies usually have sober standards of decorum that are intended to quiet passions and favor reasoned deliberation. Many demagogues violate standards of decorum outrageously, to show clearly that they are thumbing their noses at the established order and the genteel ways of the upper class, or simply because they enjoy the attention that it brings. The common people might find the demagogue disgusting, but the demagogue can use the upper class's contempt for him to show that he will not be shamed or intimidated by the powerful.

For example, Huey Long famously wore pajamas to highly dignified occasions where others were dressed at the height of formality. He once stood "bukk nekkid" at his hotel suite when laying down the law to a meeting of political fuglemen. Long was "intensely and solely interested in himself. He had to dominate every scene he was in and every person around him. He craved attention and would go to almost any length to get it. He knew that an audacious action, although it was harsh and even barbarous, could shock people into a state where they could be manipulated." He was "...so shameless in his pursuit of publicity, and so adept at getting press coverage, that he was soon attracting more attention from the press and the galleries than most of the rest of his colleagues combined."

In ancient Greece, Aristotle pointed out the bad manners of Cleon more than 2,000 years ago: "[Cleon] was the first who shouted on the public platform, who used abusive language and who spoke with his cloak girt about him, while all the others used to speak in proper dress and manner."

=== Folksy posturing ===
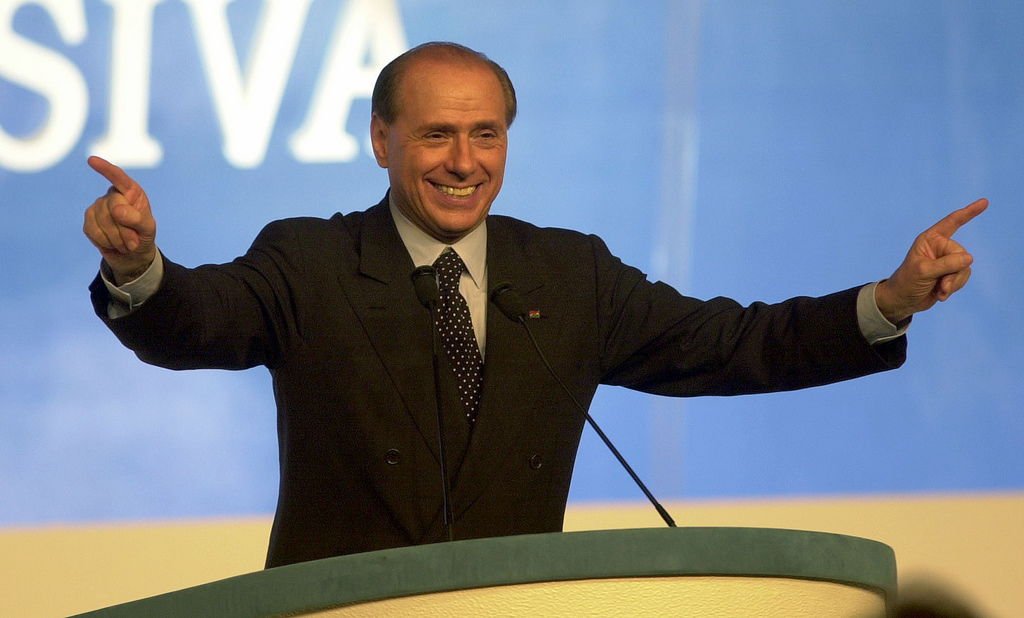
Italian Prime Minister Silvio Berlusconi during a rally

Demagogues often make a show of appearing to be down-to-earth, ordinary citizens just like the people whose votes they seek. In the United States, many took folksy nicknames: William H. Murray (1869–1956) was "Alfalfa Bill"; James M. Curley (1874–1958) of Boston was "Our Jim"; Ellison D. Smith (1864–1944) was "Cotton Ed"; the husband-and-wife demagogue team of Miriam and James E. Ferguson went by "Ma and Pa"; Texas governor W. Lee O'Daniel (1890–1969) was "Pappy-Pass-the-Biscuits".

Georgia governor Eugene Talmadge (1884–1946) put a barn and a henhouse on the executive mansion grounds, loudly explaining that he could not sleep nights unless he heard the bellowing of livestock and the cackling of poultry. When in the presence of farmers, he chewed tobacco and faked a rural accent—though he himself was college-educated—railing against "frills" and "nigger-lovin' furriners". Talamadge defined "furriner" as "Anyone who attempts to impose ideas that are contrary to the established traditions of Georgia." His grammar and vocabulary became more refined when speaking before an urban audience. Talmadge was famous for wearing gaudy red galluses, which he snapped for emphasis during his speeches. On his desk, he kept three books that he loudly told visitors were all that a governor needed: a bible, the state financial report, and a Sears–Roebuck catalog.

Huey Long emphasized his humble roots by calling himself "The Kingfish" and gulping down pot likker when visiting northern Louisiana. He once issued a press release demanding that his name be removed from the Washington Social Register. "Alfalfa Bill" made sure to remind people of his rural background by talking in the terminology of farming: "I will plow straight furrows and blast all the stumps. The common people and I can lick the whole lousy gang."

=== Making gross oversimplification ===
Demagogues commonly treat complex problems, which require patient reasoning and analysis, as if they result from one simple cause or can be solved by one simple cure. For example, Huey Long claimed that all of the U.S.'s economic problems could be solved just by "sharing the wealth". Hitler claimed that Germany had lost World War I only because of a "Stab in the Back". Scapegoating (above) is one form of gross oversimplification.

=== Attacking the news media ===
Because factual information reported by the press can undermine a demagogue's claims and standing among followers, modern demagogues have attacked the press intemperately. At times, demagogues have called for violence against newspapers who opposed them. Some have claimed that the press was acting secretly in the service of moneyed interests or foreign powers or that newspapers had a personal vendetta against them. Huey Long accused the New Orleans Times–Picayune and Item of being "bought", and had his bodyguards rough up their reporters. Oklahoma governor "Alfalfa Bill" Murray (1869–1956) once called for a bomb to be dropped on the offices of the Daily Oklahoman. Joe McCarthy accused The Christian Science Monitor, the New York Post, The New York Times, the New York Herald Tribune, The Washington Post, the St. Louis Post-Dispatch, and other leading American newspapers of being "Communist smear sheets" under the control of the Kremlin.

== Actions in power ==
The shortest way to ruin a country is to give power to demagogues.

— Dionysius of Halicarnassus, Antiquities of Rome, VI (20 BC)

=== Establishing one-man rule, subverting the rule of law ===
In executive office, demagogues have often moved quickly to expand their power, both de jure and de facto: by getting legislation passed to officially expand their authority, and by building up networks of corruption and informal pressure to ensure that their dictates are followed regardless of constitutional authority.

For example, within two months of being appointed chancellor, Hitler unraveled all constitutional limitations on his power. He achieved this through near-daily acts of chaos, destabilizing the state and providing ever stronger reasons to justify taking more power. Hitler was appointed on January 30, 1933; on February 1, the Reichstag was dissolved; on February 27, the Reichstag building burned; on February 28, the Reichstag Fire Decree gave Hitler emergency powers and suspended civil liberties; on March 5, new general elections were held; on March 22, the first concentration camp opened, taking political prisoners. On March 24, the Enabling Act was passed, giving Hitler full legislative powers, thus ending all constitutional restraint and making Hitler absolute dictator. Consolidation of power continued even after that; see Early timeline of Nazism.

Even local demagogues have established one-man rule, or a near approximation of it, over their constituencies. "Alfalfa Bill" Murray, a demagogue who was elected governor of Oklahoma by appealing to poor rural animosity toward "craven wolves of plutocracy", promised to "make an open season on millionaires." Despite having presided over Oklahoma's constitutional convention, Murray routinely violated the constitution, ruling by executive order whenever the legislature or the courts got in his way. When federal courts ruled against him, he prevailed by relying on the National Guard, even donning a military hat and pistol and personally commanding the troops—and seeing to it that the confrontation was filmed by movie cameras. Murray attempted to expand gubernatorial powers with a set of four initiatives, replacing existing income-tax law with his own, giving him power to appoint all members of the board of education, acquiring corporation-owned land, and giving him extraordinary power over the budget, but these were defeated.

=== Appointing unqualified lackeys to high office ===
Demagogues often appoint people to high office based on personal loyalty without regard to competence for the office—opening up extraordinary avenues for graft and corruption. During "Alfalfa Bill" Murray's campaign for governor, he promised to crack down on corruption and favoritism for the rich, to abolish half the clerk jobs at the State House, to appoint no family members, to reduce the number of state-owned cars from 800 to 200, never to use convict labor to compete with commercial labor, and not to abuse the power of pardon. Once in office, he appointed wealthy patrons and 20 of his relatives to high office, purchased more cars, used prisoners to make ice for sale and clean the capitol building, and violated all the other promises. When the State Auditor pointed out that 1,050 new employees had been added to the state payroll, Murray simply said, "Just damned lies." For each abuse of power, Murray claimed a mandate from "the sovereign will of the people".

== Notable demagogues ==
=== Ancient history ===
==== Cleon (died 422 BC) ====
The Athenian leader Cleon is often cited as a demagogue because of three events described in the writings of Thucydides and Aristophanes.

First, after a failed revolt by the city of Mytilene, Cleon persuaded the Athenians to slaughter not just the Mytilenean prisoners, but every man in the city, and to sell their wives and children as slaves. The Athenians rescinded the resolution the following day when they came to their senses.

Second, after Athens had completely defeated the Peloponnesian fleet in the Battle of Sphacteria and Sparta could only beg for peace on almost any terms, Cleon persuaded the Athenians to reject the peace offer.

Third, he taunted the Athenian generals over their failure to bring the war in Sphacteria to a rapid close, accusing them of cowardice, and declared that he could finish the job himself in 20 days, despite having no military knowledge. They gave him the job, expecting him to fail. Cleon shrank at being called to make good on his boast, and tried to get out of it, but he was forced to take the command. In fact, he succeeded—by getting the general Demosthenes to do it, now treating him with respect after previously slandering him behind his back. Three years later, Cleon and his Spartan counterpart Brasidas were killed at the Battle of Amphipolis, enabling a restoration of peace that lasted until the outbreak of the Second Peloponnesian War.

Modern commentators suspect that Thucydides and Aristophanes exaggerated the vileness of Cleon's real character. Both had personal conflicts with Cleon, and The Knights is a satirical, allegorical comedy that does not even mention Cleon by name. Cleon was a tradesman—a leather-tanner. Thucydides and Aristophanes came from the upper classes, predisposed to look down on the commercial classes. Nevertheless, their portrayals define the archetypal example of the "demagogue" or "rabble-rouser".

==== Alcibiades (c.450–404 BC) ====
Alcibiades convinced the people of Athens to attempt to conquer Sicily during the Peloponnesian War, with disastrous results. He led the Athenian assembly to support making him commander by claiming victory would come easily, appealing to Athenian vanity, and appealing to action and courage over deliberation. Alcibiades's expedition might have succeeded if he had not been denied command by the political maneuvers of his rivals.

==== Gaius Flaminius (c. 275–217 BC) ====
Gaius Flaminius was a Roman consul most known for being defeated by Hannibal at the Battle of Lake Trasimene during the second Punic war. Hannibal was able to make pivotal decisions during this battle because he understood his opponent. Flaminius was described as a demagogue by Polybius, in his book The Histories "...Flaminius possessed a rare talent for the arts of demagogy..." Because Flaminius was thus ill-suited, he lost 15,000 Roman lives, his own included, in the battle.

=== Modern era ===
==== Adolf Hitler (1889–1945) ====
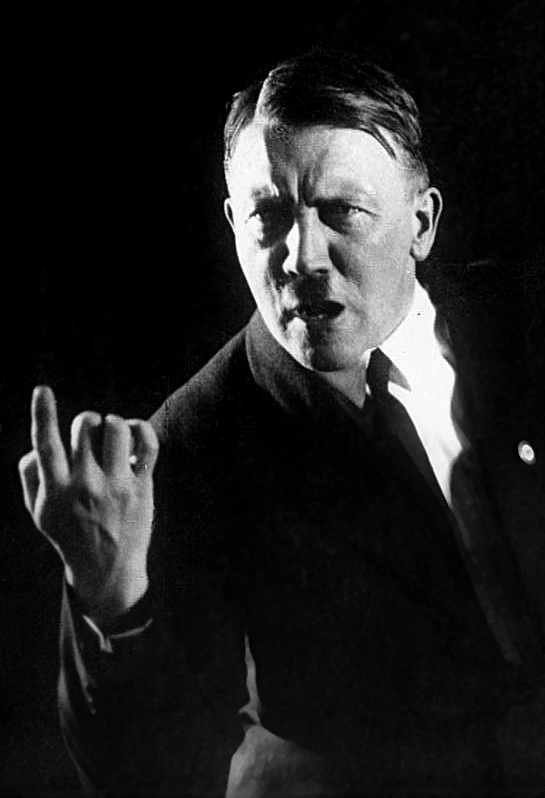
Adolf Hitler in 1927, rehearsing his oratorical gestures; photo by Heinrich Hoffmann, Bundesarchiv

The most famous demagogue of modern history, Adolf Hitler, first attempted to overthrow the Bavarian government not with popular support but by force in a failed putsch in 1923. While in prison, Hitler chose a new strategy: to overthrow the government democratically, by cultivating a mass movement. (Note: Shirer (1960) writes: "He had explained the new tactics to one of his henchmen, Karl Ludecke, while still in prison: 'When I resume active work, it will be necessary to pursue a new policy. Instead of working to achieve power by armed coup, we shall have to hold our noses and enter the Reichstag against the Catholic and Marxist deputies. If outvoting them takes longer than outshooting them, at least the result will be guaranteed by their own constitution. … Sooner or later we shall have a majority—and after that, Germany.'") Even before the putsch, Hitler had rewritten the Nazi party's platform to consciously appeal to the lower classes of Germany, appealing to their resentment of wealthier classes and calling for German unity and increased central power. (Note: Shirer (1960) writes "A good many paragraphs of the party program were obviously merely a demagogic appeal to the mood of the lower classes when they were in bad straits… Point 11, for example, demanded abolition of incomes unearned by work; Point 12, the nationalization of trusts… Point 18 demanded the death penalty for traitors, usurers, and profiteers.") Hitler was delighted by the instant increase in popularity.

While Hitler was in prison, the Nazi party vote had fallen to one million, and it continued to fall after Hitler was released in 1924 and began rejuvenating the party. For the next several years, Hitler and the Nazi party were generally regarded as a laughingstock in Germany, no longer taken seriously as a threat to the country. The prime minister of Bavaria lifted the region's ban on the party, saying, "The wild beast is checked. We can afford to loosen the chain."

In 1929, with the start of the Great Depression, Hitler's populism started to become effective. Hitler updated the Nazi party's platform to exploit the economic distress of ordinary Germans: repudiating the Versailles Treaty, promising to eliminate corruption, and pledging to provide every German with a job. In 1930, the Nazi party went from 200,000 votes to 6.4 million, making it the second-largest party in Parliament. By 1932, the Nazi party had become the largest in Parliament. In early 1933, Hitler was appointed Chancellor. He then exploited the Reichstag fire to arrest his political opponents and consolidate his control of the army. Within a few years, enjoying democratic support from the masses, Hitler took Germany from a democracy to a total dictatorship.

==== Huey Long (1893–1935) ====
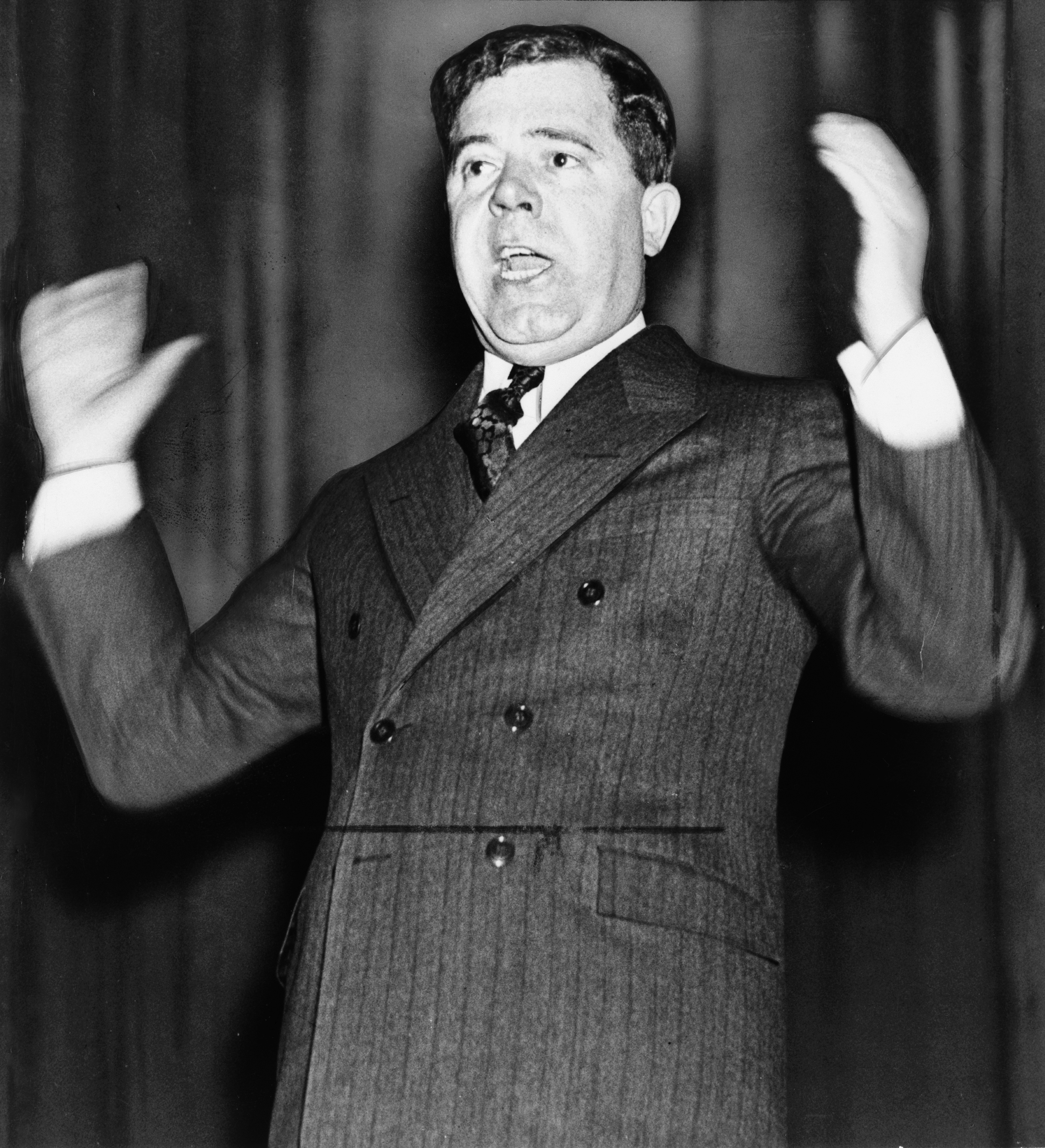
Huey Long, governor of Louisiana

Huey Long, nicknamed "The Kingfish", was an American politician who served as the 40th governor of Louisiana from 1928 to 1932 and as a member of the United States Senate from 1932 until his assassination in 1935. He was a populist member of the Democratic Party and rose to national prominence during the Great Depression for his vocal criticism from the left of President Franklin D. Roosevelt and his New Deal. As the political leader of Louisiana, he commanded wide networks of supporters and often took forceful action. A controversial figure, Long is celebrated as a populist benefactor or conversely denounced as a fascist demagogue.

In 1928, before Long was sworn in as governor of Louisiana, he was already supervising political appointments to ensure a loyal majority for all his initiatives. As governor, he ousted public officers not personally loyal to him and took control away from state commissions to ensure that all contracts would be awarded to people in his political machine. In a confrontation over natural gas with managers of the Public Service Corporation, he told them, truthfully, "A deck has 52 cards and in Baton Rouge I hold all 52 of them and I can shuffle and deal as I please. I can have bills passed or I can kill them. I'll give you until Saturday to decide." They yielded to Long—and became part of his ever-expanding machine.

When Long became a senator in 1932, his enemy, the lieutenant governor Paul N. Cyr, was sworn in as governor. Long, without authority, ordered state troopers to surround the executive mansion and arrest Cyr as an imposter. Long installed his ally Alvin O. King as governor, later replaced by O.K. Allen, serving as stooges for Long. Thus even in Washington, with no official authority, Long retained dictatorial control over Louisiana. When the Mayor of New Orleans, T. Semmes Walmsley, began to oppose Long's extraordinary power over the state, Long exploited a subservient judge to justify making an armed attack on the basis of cracking down on racketeering. At Long's order, Governor Allen declared martial law and dispatched National Guardsmen to seize the Registrar of Voters, allegedly "to prevent election frauds". Then, by stuffing ballot boxes, Long ensured victory for his candidates to Congress. Long's own racketeering operation then grew. With his "trained seal" legislature, armed militias, taxation used as a political weapon, control over elections, and weakened court authority to limit his power, Huey Long maintained control in Louisiana in a manner arguably comparable to that of a dictator.

==== Philip La Follette (1897–1965) ====
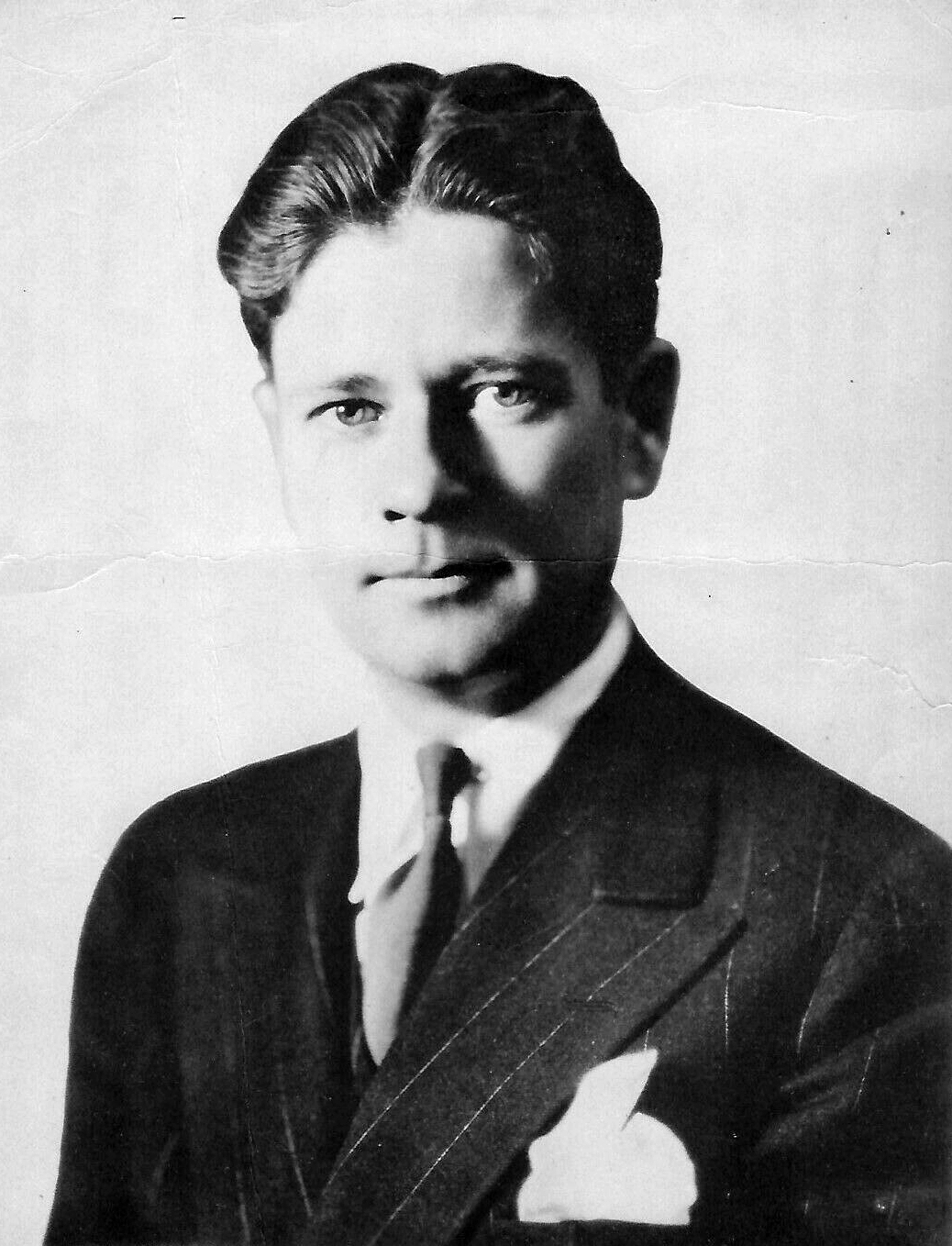
Philip La Follette, governor of Wisconsin

Philip La Follette was an American politician who severed as Governor of Wisconsin from 1931 to 1933 as a member of the Republican Party of Wisconsin and from 1935 to 1939 as a member of the Wisconsin Progressive Party-National Progressives, in which he was accused of authoritarianism, fascism and demagoguery.

In a series of legislative sessions, bills were introduced and passed with restrictions on parliamentary debate and without hearings from the public. Additionally, the presiding officers of both chambers would repeatedly rule standard parliamentary procedure as out of order. With the final hours of the 1936 session spent confirming 24 of La Follette's administrative appointments. The session immediately drew controversy as members of both major parties left the chamber shouting "heil" in a mock Nazi salute. while comparisons were made in the media to the dictatorial actions of the deceased Governor of Louisiana Huey Long. in 1937, during a special session within the 63rd Wisconsin Legislature Philip La Follette attempted to force through a bill without public debate, and without the normal machinery of the legislative process. The bill, decried by critics as dictatorial, would have, among other things, fundamentally altered the system of checks and balances in Wisconsin by making it so that legislation would be written up by the executive and handed to the legislature to either approve or reject. Alongside this, the session passed through legislation reorganizing the state executive branch to remove redundant agencies to improve efficiency.

Flag of the National Progressives of America

In 1938, he formed the National Progressives of America (NPA) in a attempt to take the success of the Wisconsin Progressive Party to the national level. The party's official logo, using the national colors of red-white-and-blue and ostensibly depicting a marked ballot space. appeared to some as the offspring of a Confederate battle flag and the logo of Nazi Germany. It was often described as a "mutilated swastika" as well as a "circumcised swastika" by eastern liberals. In reaction to the rally in which Philip announced the formation of the NPA, Heywood Broun, a prominent journalist, criticized the event for its attempts at appealing to the middle class, claiming that "the most formidable fascist movement which has yet arisen in America is being nurtured in Madison, Wisconsin by Phil La Follette". The New York Times described the NPA as "largely rural and conservative, with an eye to the great farm vote."

==== Joseph McCarthy (1908–1957) ====
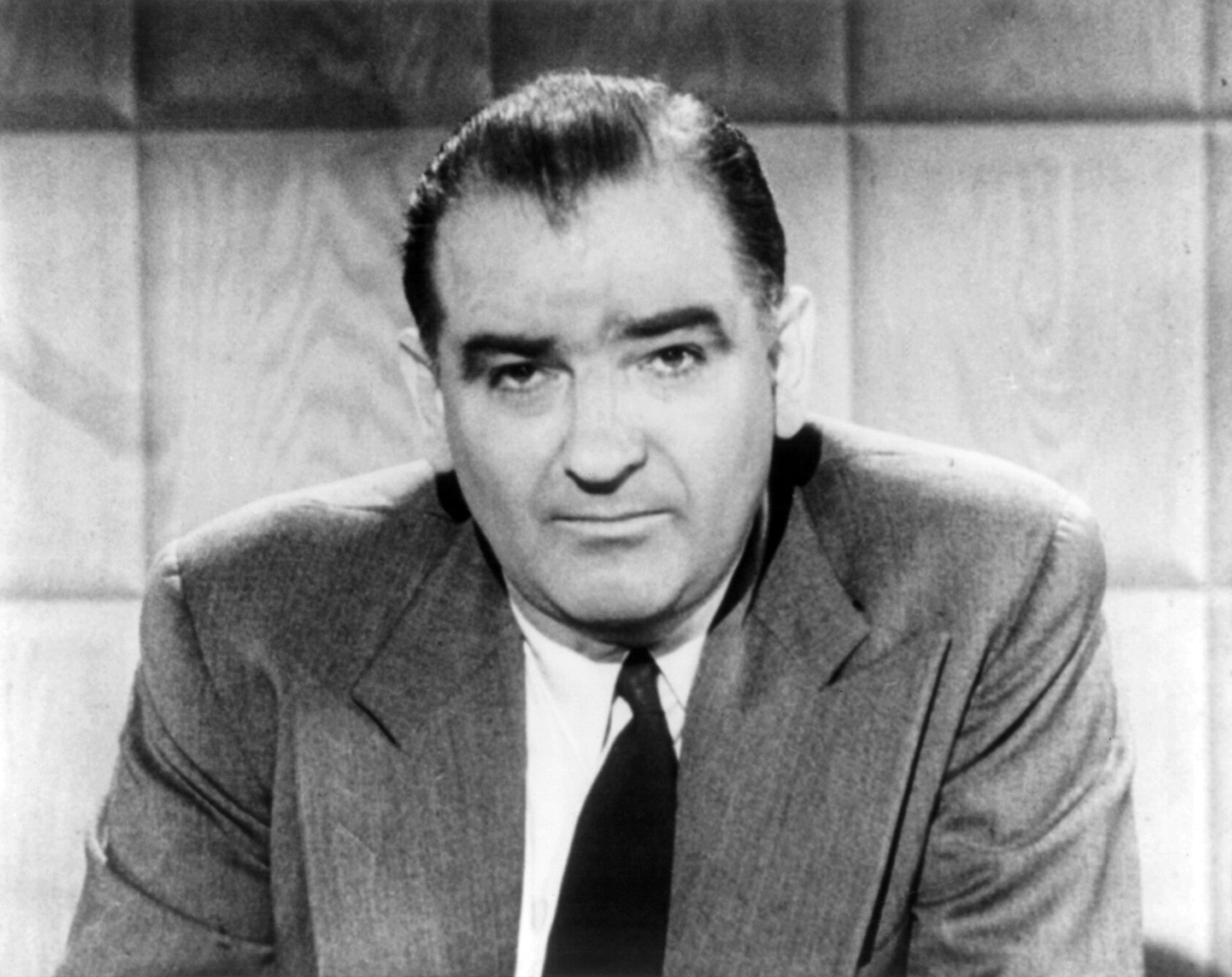
Senator Joseph McCarthy, an American demagogue

Joseph McCarthy was a U.S. Senator from the state of Wisconsin from 1947 to 1957. Though a poor orator, McCarthy rose to national prominence during the early 1950s by proclaiming that high places in the United States federal government and military were "infested" with communists, contributing to the second "Red Scare". Ultimately, his inability to provide proof for his claims, as well as his public attacks on the United States Army, led to the Army–McCarthy hearings in 1954, which in turn led to his censure by the Senate and fall from popularity.

==== Donald Trump ====
Multiple sources have described Donald Trump as a demagogue. During the 2016 presidential campaign, Trump employed a number of rhetorical strategies which took advantage of the democratic crisis in the US and helped him to win the election. Trump has presented himself as the people's champion, proclaiming his presidency as the only means to "make America great again" in a form of national redemption. One key feature of this relies on his anti-immigration platform and immigration policies, such as mass deportations and building a wall between Mexico and the United States, stances which form a large part of his appeal to his supporters. At times his anti-immigration rhetoric has drawn parallels to Hitler, most notably when he remarked that immigrants are "poisoning the blood" of the US. This position, which Trump and his administration has repeatedly expressed, embodies an "us vs. them" mentality which has often been a feature of populism.

==== Narendra Modi ====
Narendra Modi, the Prime Minister of India since 2014, is described as a demagogue for his religiously divisive politics as well as his promotion of Hindutva ideology.

== Positive demagoguery ==
=== Tactical demagoguery ===
In Demagogues in American Politics, Charles U. Zug argues that demagoguery can be legitimate and even good if integrated into a broader strategy for political reform and if coupled with a robust rationale for political change. Zug contrasts classical or traditional approaches to demagoguery, which assume that demagogues are motivated by vicious intentions (such as an unrestrained desire for power), with a modern approach that focuses on the external words and deeds that demagogues use to advance political goals. Relatedly, as Princeton Classicist Melissa Lane has argued, in pre-Socratic antiquity demagogues were originally viewed as neither inherently good nor inherently bad, but rather as advocates for the common people (as opposed to the oligarchs). Zug has argued that conceiving of demagoguery as an inherently negative practice incentivizes political actors to weaponize the label "demagogue"; as a consequence, otherwise innocent victims—such as the supposed leader of Shays' Rebellion, Daniel Shays—can be inaccurately branded as vicious, unscrupulous leaders.

=== Demagoguery in constitutional office ===
Zug also argues that demagoguery takes on different meanings when deployed by public officials in different institutions; for example, American federal judges should be scrutinized more carefully for using demagoguery than should legislators, since the act of judging well—i.e., adjudicating legal disputes—does not require direct appeals to the public. In contrast, being an effective member of Congress requires advocating for a constituency and getting (re)elected; and these responsibilities in turn require direct public appeals, and sometimes, demagoguery.

== See also ==
- Authoritarianism
- Big lie
- Charismatic authority
- Cleophon
- Cult of personality
- Demades
- Firehosing
- Hyperbolus
- It Can't Happen Here
- Lachares
- Majoritarianism
- Narcissistic leadership
- Ochlocracy
- Pied Piper
- Populism
- Social dominance orientation
- Strongman (politics)
- Toxic leader

== Sources ==
- Shirer, William Lawrence (1960), The Rise and Fall of the Third Reich: A History of Nazi Germany, New York City: Simon & Schuster, ASIN B0766DKDLR, LCCN 60006729, OCLC 1286630, OL 5794925M, Wikidata Q138029595
