= Lusatian Alliance =

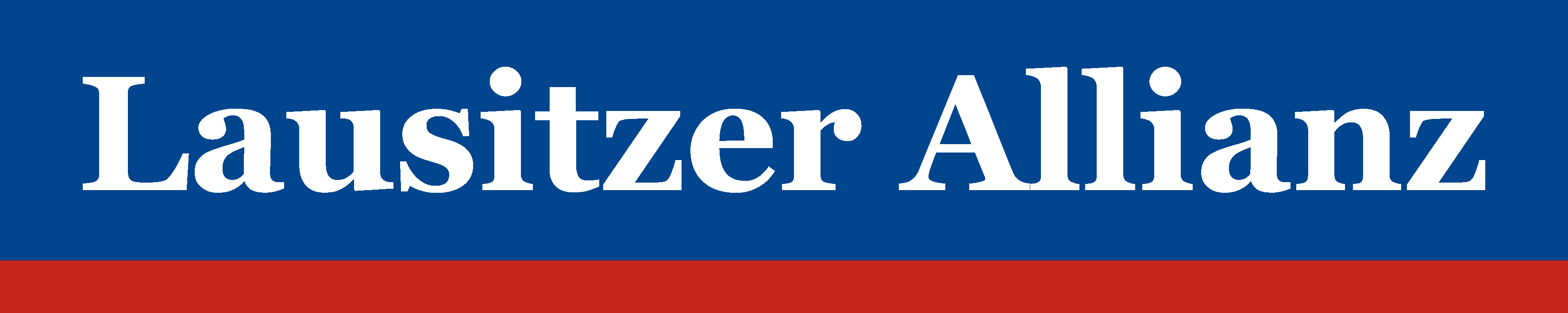
- Leader: Hannes Wilhelm-Kell
- Founded: 26 March 2005
- Headquarters: Cottbus
- Membership: 90
- Ideology: Regionalism; Ethnic minority interests
- Colours: Blue, Red and White

Website
- http://www.lausitzer-allianz.org/

The Lusatian Alliance (German: Lausitzer Allianz, Upper Sorbian: Łužiska Alianca, Lower Sorbian: Łužyska Alianca), formerly the Wendish People's Party (Upper and Lower Sorbian: Serbska Ludowa Strona, SLS; German: Wendische Volkspartei) is a political party founded on 26 March 2005 in Cottbus to represent the Sorb/Wendish ethnic and linguistic minority (around 60,000 people) in the German states of Saxony and Brandenburg in the region of Lusatia. At its third party congress of 26 April 2010 in Cottbus, the party changed its name to the Lusatian Alliance.

== Historical background ==
The party founders consider it a successor of the Lusatia People's Party founded in 1919 (renamed Wendish People's Party in 1924) which was dissolved by the Nazi regime.

== Electoral participation ==
The party arose to take part in the 2008 municipal and district elections, the 2009 Land (state) elections in Brandenburg and the 2009 municipal and regional elections in Saxony. The Wendish Popular Party has been criticised by many Sorbs, for example the Domowina, as it is felt that the group could be better represented by Sorbs within the existing German parties.

=== Threshold exemption ===
Another party representing ethnic minorities at state level, the South Schleswig Voter Federation of Danes and Frisians, has gained regional and local representation in the state of Schleswig-Holstein, where it enjoys an exemption from the electoral threshold of 5% thanks to a German-Danish treaty of 1955. A similar exemption is mentioned in the Brandenburg constitution for the Sorb/Wendish minority, but not in Saxony. Accordingly, the party leaders have said that they need 7,000 votes in Brandenburg to gain a seat in the Landtag of Brandenburg.

=== 2008 Municipal and district elections in Brandenburg ===
For the 28 September 2008 local elections in Brandenburg, the party took part in the Spree-Neiße Kreis (district) elections on a ticket with the Klinge Runde Citizens Initiative as «Bürger für die Lausitz – Klinger Runde». The ticket gained two seats - out of 50 - at the district assembly. In several municipalities in the same district it had some candidates for the municipal elections.
