= Wilhelm Henning =

German officer and politician

- Born: Wilhelm Henning; 26 July 1879; Bruchsal, Baden, Germany
- Died: 24 October 1943 (aged 64); Lichterfelde, Berlin, Germany
- Occupation: Army officer
- Known for: Politician
- Political party: German National People's Party, German Völkisch Freedom Party, National Socialist Freedom Movement, Nazi Party

Wilhelm Henning (26 July 1879 in Bruchsal, Baden – 24 October 1943 in Lichterfelde, Berlin) was a German military officer and right-wing politician.

== Military service ==
Henning enlisted as an officer in the German Imperial Army and remained until 1919 when he retired with the rank of Major. From 1917 he served in the War Ministry and was moved to St Petersburg in 1918.

== Politics ==
Entering politics, Henning joined the conservative German National People's Party (DNVP) and was elected to the Reichstag in 1920. From the start Henning was on the extreme antisemitic and was close to the likes of Albrecht von Graefe, Reinhold Wulle and Richard Kunze, although the latter split from the DNVP in 1921 to form his own Deutschsoziale Partei.

=== Rathenau controversy ===
Henning became notorious for an article of his that appeared in the June 1922 edition of Konservative Monatsschrift. In the article, 'The Real Face of Rapallo Terror', Henning denounced Walther Rathenau as an "international Jew" who had sullied German honour by not mentioning the murder of envoy Wilhelm Graf von Mirbach-Horff in Moscow during the Treaty of Rapallo negotiations. With Rathenau murdered at around the same time it appeared that rogue elements within the DNVP were endorsing political murder and so, under pressure from Chancellor Joseph Wirth, the DNVP leadership expelled the far right antisemitic wing, including Henning. In response Henning joined with Wulle and von Graefe in establishing the German Völkisch Freedom Party (DVFP) as a rightist splinter group. Henning continued to represent this group (as well as the National Socialist Freedom Movement, a joint list with the Nazi Party active after the Beer Hall Putsch) in the Reichstag until 1928.

== Later years ==
During the struggles for the leadership of the Völkisch movement between the DVFP and the Nazis Henning had been a strong critic of Adolf Hitler and had denounced him as "not a politician". Despite this he would go one to serve as a Nazi Party member after the collapse of the DVFP. Henning also served as the deputy chairman of the Verband nationalgesinnter Soldaten, a right-wing veterans organisation active in the 1920s.
