= Wendish People's Party =

Defunct political party in Germany representing Sorbs

The Wendish People's Party (German: Wendische Volkspartei, Upper Sorbian: Serbska ludowa strona) was a political party of the Sorbs in Weimar Germany from 1919 to 1933. It was led by Jakub Lorenc-Zalěski during its entire existence.

== History ==
The party was originally known as the Lusatian People's Party (Lausitzer Volkspartei). It ran in the 1920 federal elections, but received just 0.03% of the vote and failed to win a seat. By the May 1924 elections the party had changed its name to the Wendish People's Party. It ran as part of the National Minorities Alliance, but again failed to win a seat, receiving just 0.04% of the national vote.

The December 1924 elections saw the party's vote share halve to 0.02%, whilst in the 1928 elections it again saw a fall in popular support, receiving just 3,111 votes. The party did not contest any further elections.

A new party under the same name was founded in 2005, changing its name to the Lusatian Alliance in 2010.
