= German Völkisch Freedom Party =

Far-right political party in Weimar Germany (1922–1924)

German Völkisch Freedom Party Deutschvölkische Freiheitspartei
- Founded: 16 December 1922; 103 years ago
- Dissolved: 14 July 1933; 93 years ago
- Split from: German National People's Party
- Merged into: National Socialist German Worker's Party
- Women's wing: Ring völkischer Frauen
- Paramilitary wing: Völkischen Turnerschaften
- Ideology: Para-Nazism; Antisemitism; Völkisch nationalism; Ultranationalism; German neoconservatism
- Political position: Far-right
- Electoral alliance: National Socialist Freedom Movement (Note: From April 1924 to February 1925)
- Colours: Black White Red

Party flag

The German Völkisch Freedom Party (German: Deutschvölkische Freiheitspartei, or DVFP) was an early far-right political party of Weimar Germany that took its name from the Völkisch movement, a right-wing populist and antisemitic movement focused on folklore and the German Volk. Anti-communist, its criticism of capitalism reflected economic antisemitism rather than socialism. The DVFP was founded on 16 December 1922, when Wilhelm Henning, Reinhold Wulle, and Albrecht von Graefe broke from the German National People's Party (DNVP). Leading right-wing figures, such as Ernst Graf zu Reventlow, Artur Dinter, and Theodor Fritsch, joined the party on its foundation.

Many members of the Deutschvölkischer Schutz- und Trutzbund joined the DVFP after the former was banned. After the Nazi Party was banned in the wake of the Beer Hall Putsch, the DVFP entered into an electoral alliance with many Nazis to form the National Socialist Freedom Movement in early 1924, a move endorsed by Erich Ludendorff and encouraged by Graefe, who hoped to gain control of the far right as a whole. This alliance was not a success, plans for a full merger fell through in August 1924, and Graefe and Wulle re-formed the DVFP, now named the German Völkisch Freedom Movement, as a rival to the Nazi Party in February 1925. The revived party was banned along with other non-Nazi parties in 1933.

== History ==
=== Background ===
After the November Revolution, nationalist groups such as the German National People's Party (DNVP) joined the national-conservative DNVP. Tensions within the DNVP became apparent in March 1920 during the Kapp Putsch, which was partly supported but mostly rejected as hopeless. After the failed putsch, nationalists emerged as representatives of a radical faction within the DNVP, vehemently rejecting the Weimar Republic and opposing the moderate course of its chairman, Oskar Hergt.

Following the assassination of then-Foreign Minister Walther Rathenau in June 1922, heated disputes erupted within the DNVP (German National People's Party), resulting in the expulsion of MP Wilhelm Henning from the parliamentary group, though not from the party itself. Shortly before Rathenau's murder, Henning had launched a scathing antisemitic attack, stating that he would be "held accountable by the German people." Two leading nationalist DNVP MPs, Albrecht von Graefe and Reinhold Wulle, expressed their solidarity with Henning and left the parliamentary group with him.

In addition, Graefe, Henning, and Wulle founded the Völkische Arbeitsgemeinschaft (Völkische Working Group) as an internal DNVP (German National People's Party) hub for the völkische movement. The party leadership deemed this organization incompatible with the DNVP, whereupon Graefe, rather undiplomatically, suggested that the Working Group be run as an organization outside the party. When the party leadership refused and demanded the dissolution of the Working Group, Graefe saw in it the power of the " All-Jewish " who was introducing a "divisive bacillus" into "national development."

=== Formation ===
On 16 December 1922, the three MPs expelled from the DNVP founded the German National Freedom Party (DVFP). Graefe was elected leader of this party and remained so until 1928, when his deputy, Wulle, replaced him. Ernst zu Reventlow, who addressed programmatic issues in his journal Reichswart, was also among the leading DVFP politicians. The chairman of the Pan-German League, Heinrich Claß, had declined the party leadership offered to him. Graefe and Wulle had publicly quarreled with him in 1920. Graefe had accused him of Freemasonry and claimed that the Pan-German League, itself antisemitic, was under "Zionist" control.

One day after its founding, the party published a manifesto equating parliamentary democracy with the rule of money and Jews. The Reichstag was to be replaced by a corporatist professional parliament, and the executive branch was to be handed over to a "racial dictator." New laws were also intended to reverse the emancipation of Jews and legalize their expropriation. Small and medium-sized enterprises were to be favored over corporations, and speculative capital was to be regulated by new stock market legislation. With this program, the party placed itself in the tradition of the antisemitic parties of the Imperial era.

=== Development ===
The DVFP was conceived as an umbrella organization for right-wing extremist, sometimes militant, organizations, intended to include not only individual members but also entire associations in order to achieve the broadest possible union of all völkisch groups. In this respect, it was related to the Völkisch Working Group, but unlike the latter, it was a political party.

Around two-thirds of the DNVP's Mecklenburg-Schwerin state association joined the DVFP immediately after its founding. Prominent antisemites such as Theodor Fritsch and Artur Dinter supported the new party, but some nationalists and antisemites remained in the DNVP. After the Greater German Workers' Party, a North German successor organization to the NSDAP, was banned, it emerged in January 1923 under the leadership of the influential Freikorps.The DVFP was founded by its leader Gerhard Roßbach. In addition to the Freikorps troops that Roßbach brought with him, there were further additions from various paramilitary organizations: Numerous new party members came from the German Nationalist Protection and Defense League, which was banned in 1922. There were also personnel overlaps with the Black Reichswehr. The DVFP tasked Roßbach, who was also a member of the party leadership, with organizing its own paramilitary organization, the Nationalist Gymnastics Associations. It also built up a "military apparatus" disguised as a hall security organization. According to Gumbel, a contemporary expert on the nationalist far right, the party had already established 165 companies in northern Germany alone at the time of its ban, trained them militarily, defined codes for the event of a putsch, and devised a detailed deployment plan.

Thus, the DVFP quickly developed into an umbrella organization for anti-republican, militant forces. So many troops were under its command that Colonel General von Seeckt, then Chief of the Army Command of the Reichswehr, mentioned in a letter in February 1923 that he had held talks with Graefe, Hitler, and Ludendorff in the event of an armed conflict over the French occupation of the Ruhr, to clarify whether their respective troops would submit to the Army Command in a crisis.

The DVFP had now become a mixture of an independent far-right party, an NSDAP front organization, and an umbrella organization for various militant and nationalist groups, and as such – and with it Graefe and Wulle – was in the midst of a putsch. It was implicated in assassinations and political murders. Little is known about the exact composition of the DVFP membership, but former soldiers, especially officers and Freikorps members, landowners, civil servants, academics, as well as entrepreneurs, craftsmen and businesspeople were disproportionately represented.

=== Alliance with NSDAP ===
At the end of February 1924, the bans on the DVFP in the Reich and Prussia were lifted. In the Reichstag elections in May 1924, the DVFP ran in a list association with substitute organizations of the still banned NSDAP around Alfred Rosenberg and Gregor Strasser under various names (including the Völkisch-soziale Block). This alliance achieved strong results in state elections held at the same time (19.3% in Mecklenburg-Schwerin. In the Reichstag elections, the alliance achieved 6.5% and thus 32 seats.

At Ludendorff's suggestion, the parliamentary group called itself the National Socialist Freedom Party, a concession to the National Socialists, although they provided only ten of the 32 deputies. Ludendorff appointed Albrecht von Graefe "as his confidant" as parliamentary group leader. When Ludendorff announced the merger of the parties that formed the NSFP into the National Socialists in May 1924, the North German National Socialists broke away. During this time, leaders of the NSDAP accused Graefe in letters of having often tried to disadvantage the NSDAP in the division of constituencies. Furthermore, he had misleadingly claimed that NSDAP associations should join the DVFP and that NSDAP members had to subordinate themselves to him on Ludendorff's orders. In a short time, more and more National Socialists left the NSFP. Rosenberg accused the DVFP of representing only a small upper class.

=== Second ban ===
The DVFB was finally banned by the law against the formation of new parties of 14 July 1933. In Mecklenburg, individual smaller völkisch groups were still active until the beginning of 1934. A report by the Reich Governor in Mecklenburg blamed the work of German nationalists for the comparatively high proportion of no votes in the so-called plebiscite in November 1933. While Graefe died of natural causes just a few months after the transfer of power to the National Socialists, Wulle was arrested by the Nazis in 1940 and held in the Sachsenhausen concentration camp.

== Ideology ==
The DVFP positioned itself with the NSDAP, recognized by historians as being in the extreme right of the Weimar party spectrum: the republic was to be overthrown in favor of a "völkisch dictatorship", the Reichstag was to be replaced by a professional parliament of the estates. Socialist attempts were to be prevented by exceptional courts and the Treaty of Versailles was to be annulled. The party blamed Jews and "Jewish Marxism" for Germany's economic problems. Unlike the NSDAP, the DVFP urged for a return to aristocratic conservatism of the old system – for the restoration of the pre-war system without any changes or reforms. In contrast to the early days of the NSDAP, the DVFP, which had emerged from the conservative DNVP, initially relied on elections despite the rejection of parliamentarians, but also took part in coup attempts in the course of the process.

Antisemitism was a central component of the DVFP ideology. It was evident in many different places in the program: Jews were to be expropriated and their emancipation was reversed. The party blamed "Jewish Marxism" for the economic problems in Germany. In contrast to the DNVP, from which it had split, the DVFP gave itself a so-called "Aryan paragraph". With these provisions and the demands for the regulation of speculative capital, which was largely equated with Jewish interests, and for the preference of medium-sized companies over corporations, the party placed itself in the tradition of the antisemitic parties of the imperial era.

== Gallery ==
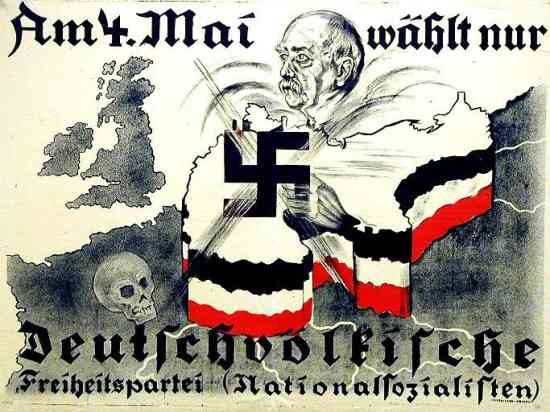
Propaganda poster of DVFP evoking the spirit of Otto von Bismarck

== List of founders ==
Founders of the German Völkisch Freedom Party:

- Wilhelm Henning
- Reinhold Wulle
- Albrecht von Graefe

== Election results ==
In some districts, it was called the Völkisch-nationaler Block or Volksbloc. In the Bavarian elections of April 1924, the Volksbloc had been able to elect 23 of 129 deputies to the state legislature.

In the May 1924 elections, the NSFB won 32 seats in the Reichstag. The eminent World War I General Erich Ludendorff and former SA head Ernst Röhm and also Theodor Fritsch, Wilhelm Kube, Theodor Vahlen, Ernst Graf zu Reventlow, Albrecht von Graefe and Christian Mergenthaler were among the winning candidates. However, in the December 1924 elections the party lost 18 of these seats.

German Reichstag

Election year	Votes	%	Seats won	+/–	Notes
May 1924	1,918,329	6.5 (6th)	32 / 491	▲32	
December 1924	907,242	3.0 (8th)	14 / 491	▼18	

== See also ==
- Black Front
- Theodor Fritsch
- Reichshammerbund
- Thule Society
- Conservative Revolution
- Strasserism
