= List of presidents of the Landtag of the Free People's State of Württemberg =

The following is a list of presidents of the Landtag of the Free People's State of Württemberg.

Name	Period	Party
Wilhelm Keil	1919–1920	SPD
Karl Walter	1920–1924	Zentrum
Theodor Körner	1924–1928	WBWB
Albert Pflüger	1928–1932	SPD
Christian Mergenthaler	1932–1933	NSDAP
Jonathan Schmid	1933	NSDAP
Karl Waldmann	1933	NSDAP

== Sources ==
- Raberg, Frank: Biographische Handbuch der württembergischen Landtagsabgeordneten 1815-1933, Kohlhammer Verlag Stuttgart 2001 ISBN 3-17-016604-2
