= Reinhold Wulle =

German politician and publicist

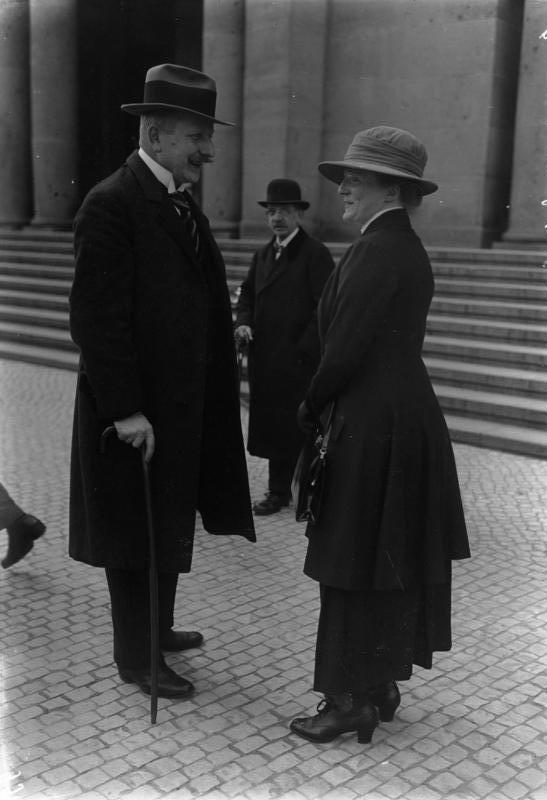
- Wulle (pictured, standing on the left) at the opening of the Reichstag on 5 January 1925
- Born: 1 August 1882; Falkenberg, German Empire
- Died: 16 July 1950 (aged 67); Gronau, North Rhine-Westphalia, West Germany
- Citizenship: German
- Known for: Völkisch politician and publicist
- Political party: German National People's Party, German Völkisch Freedom Party, National Socialist Freedom Movement, Deutsche Aufbaupartei, Deutsche Konservative Partei

Reinhold Wulle (1 August 1882 – 16 July 1950) was a German Völkisch politician and journalist active during the Weimar Republic.

== Völkisch politics ==
Wulle was born in Falkenberg, Pomerania. He studied theology, German and history and in 1908 embarked on a career as a journalist, becoming especially noted for his antisemitic views. He became editor of the Berlin-based Deutsche Zeitung in 1918 – holding the position until 1920 – and under his stewardship the paper gave support to the Pan-German movement.

Wulle entered party politics in the spring of 1920 when he joined fellow rightists Arnold Ruge and Richard Kunze in creating the Deutschvölkischen Arbeitsring Berlin as a successor to the Deutschvölkischer Schutz und Trutzbund. However this group proved short-lived as it was absorbed into the German National People's Party (DNVP) in June of the same year. Wulle became a leading member of the Völkisch wing of the DNVP, and as such was close to the likes of fellow Reichstag members Albrecht von Graefe and Wilhelm Henning.

Henning was excluded from the DNVP in 1922 due to his extreme views and Wulle joined his comrade and von Graefe in setting up a völkisch working group. This formed the basis of the German Völkisch Freedom Party (DVFP), an antisemitic political party which they established on 16 December 1922 with Wulle as deputy chairman. Wulle and his allies were all members of the Reichstag and they were soon joined in leading the party by the likes of Ernst Graf zu Reventlow, Artur Dinter and Theodor Fritsch. During his involvement in the DVFP Wulle was investigated for involvement in a possible coup attempt by the Black Reichswehr, although not much came of it. In the mid-1920s, Wulle would be accused of involvement in feme murders, albeit he was never charged.

Given their far right, antisemitic views the DVFP soon began to co-operate with the Nazi Party, notably during the period in which the latter was officially illegal and Adolf Hitler was imprisoned (although links between Wulle and Hitler actually dated back as far as 1920, when the two held a series of meetings). On this basis Wulle was re-elected to the Reichstag in the May 1924 election for the National Socialist Freedom Movement although the alliance with the NSDAP was somewhat shaky with Wulle criticising the Socialist 'class war' mentality that was still rife in many sections of the Nazi Party at that time in party documents. With personality clashes also an issue, Wulle joined Reventlow, Graefe and Fritsch in splitting away to form their own Deutschvölkische Freiheitsbewegung in 1925 with the DVFP re-established soon afterwards. Wulle became party chairman in 1928, although by then it had lost most of its membership to the Nazis and he soon became the leading authoritarian conservative enemy of the Harzburg Front. Wulle remained DVFP leader until 1933.

Wulle's main ideological influences were Paul de Lagarde and Julius Langbehn and he argued that a spiritual revolution was needed in Germany before any thought could be given to a seizure of power. Attracted to German cultural nationalism and some of the pagan themes that it entailed, Wulle nonetheless remained a committed Christian and the problems of reconciling these two strands were a frequent theme in his written work, of which Die Sendung des Nordes was the best known. He also sought to advocate his views elsewhere and made a speaking tour of Latin America in 1927, advancing his Pan-German opinions.

== Under the Nazis ==
Following the establishment of Nazi Germany in 1933 Wulle, who had become a staunch monarchist, welcomed the leadership of Hitler as part of a transition period towards a re-establishment of the Prussian monarchy in his newsletter, which he continued to publish. He quickly became disillusioned with Hitler however, decrying what he saw as Hitler's immorality and dismissing him as "a Bavarian cross-breed between Mussolini and Louis XIV".

Initially allowed to carry on some of his activities, Wulle was arrested on 17 August 1938 for breaching the "Heimtückegesetz" (Insidiousness Law) and the law against the new formation by parties. His two initiatives, the Gesellschaft Deutsche Freiheit and the Informationsbriefe, were banned whilst he was also expelled from the Reichsschrifttumskammer. Initially held in prison in Berlin he was taken into 'protective custody' in Sachsenhausen concentration camp in 1940, although he was a somewhat co-operative prisoner and enjoyed a comparatively easy time as a result, including being allowed to receive cigars from Prince Wilhelm of Prussia. His release was eventually secured by Wilhelm Frick, a Völkisch enthusiast and former National Socialist Freedom Movement colleague.

== Post-war activity ==
At the end of the Second World War Wulle settled in Gronau where he established the Deutsche Aufbaupartei on 31 October 1945 along with Joachim Ostau. The party was staunchly nationalist and supported the re-establishment of the monarchy, whilst dismissing Nazism as "a strange conqueror of Germany and the German soul". The party merged into the Deutsche Konservative Partei in 1946.

Wulle was briefly brought before the British military government who felt that, whilst he was not a Nazi as such, his ideas did not promote democracy to the German people.

He died in Gronau, North Rhine-Westphalia.
