= Ernst Graf zu Reventlow =

German naval officer, journalist and Nazi politician

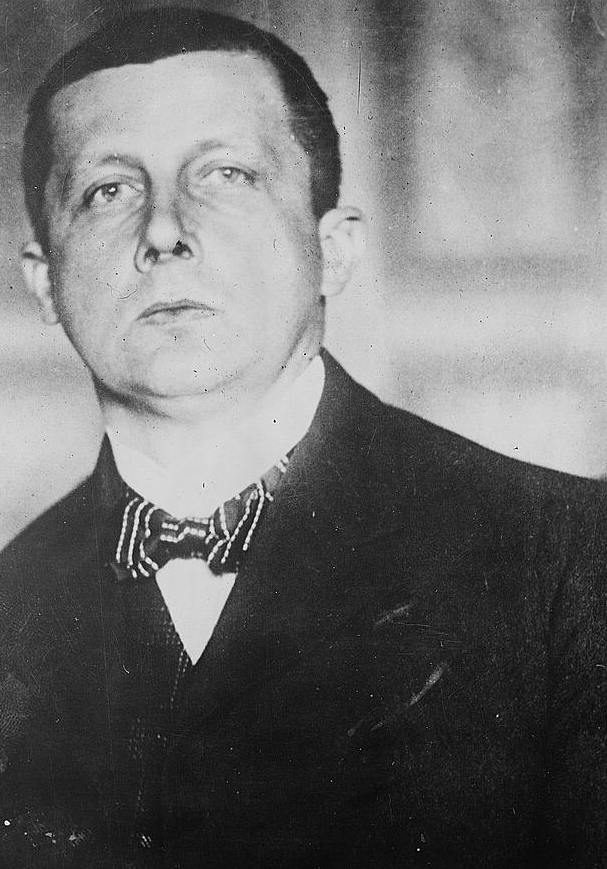
- Reventlow c. 1917

Reichstag deputy
- In office 4 May 1924 – 12 November 1933

Reichstag deputy
- In office 12 November 1933 – 21 November 1943

Personal details
- Born: 18 August 1869 Husum, Schleswig-Holstein, Kingdom of Prussia
- Died: 21 November 1943 (aged 74) Munich, Nazi Germany
- Party: DVNP (until 1924); DVFP (1924–1927); NSDAP (1927–1943)
- Profession: Journalist

Military service
- Allegiance: German Empire
- Branch/service: Imperial German Navy
- Years of service: 1888–1899
- Rank: Kapitänleutnant

Ernst Christian Einar Ludvig Detlev, Graf zu Reventlow (18 August 1869 – 21 November 1943) was a German naval officer, journalist and Nazi politician. A conservative aristocrat and a German nationalist, he was a member of several right-wing parties but also was attracted to National Bolshevism before transferring his allegiance to Adolf Hitler and the Nazi Party in 1927, becoming a member of its Strasserist wing. He was a long-serving deputy in the Reichstag of the Weimar Republic and Nazi Germany from 1924 until his death.

== Family and early life ==
Ernst Christian Einar Ludvig Detlev, Graf (Count) zu Reventlow was born at Husum, Schleswig-Holstein, the son of Ludvig Christian Detlev Frederik, Graf zu Reventlow (1824–1893), a Danish nobleman, and Emilie Julie Anna Louise Rantzau (1834–1905). His younger sister was Fanny zu Reventlow (1871–1918), the "Bohemian Countess" of Schwabing.

After graduating from secondary school, Reventlow embarked upon a career in the German Imperial Navy in 1888, reaching the rank of Kapitänleutnant, before his marriage to a Frenchwoman, Marie-Gabrielle-Blanche d'Allemont [de Broutillot] (1873 – 1937), forced him to resign his commission in 1899. He moved to Central America to seek his fortune as a planter before returning to Germany in 1905. At that time, he became a free-lance writer on naval issues, and later general politics. At the Reichstag elections of 1907 and 1912, he ran unsuccessfully as a candidate of the far right-wing German Social Party. He was a member of the leadership of the Pan-German League and was a strong supporter of German colonial policy. He also served as editor-in-chief of the Alldeutsche Blätter from 1908 to 1914.

== First World War ==
During the First World War, Reventlow was an editorial writer on the Deutsche Tageszeitung and advocated extreme ruthlessness, particularly in submarine warfare. He accused United States Ambassador James W. Gerard of being a British spy, but assailed Arthur Zimmermann for the plot to form an alliance between Mexico and Japan against the United States. He furiously attacked Germany's leaders for yielding to the United States' demands for respect of its rights after the sinking of the Lusitania, and the Tageszeitung was suspended on 25 June 1915. In 1916, for an attack on Chancellor Bethmann Hollweg, accusing him of misleading Paul von Hindenburg, Reventlow was sued for defamation.

Reventlow was highly critical of the policies of Kaiser Wilhelm II and later of the Weimar Republic. In 1920 he founded his own newspaper, Der Reichswart ("Guardian of the Realm"), which he published until his death.

== National Bolshevik period ==
In the immediate post-War period, a National Bolshevik idea came from Comintern agent Karl Radek, postulating that a community of interests existed between German nationalists and the isolated Bolshevik regime in Russia. At first, Reventlow denounced the "delusion of the so-called National Bolsheviks that Communism could turn towards nationalism," but when Radek seized the occasion of the Ruhr occupation to deliver his Schlageter Oration before the Enlarged Executive Committee of the Comintern in 1923, Reventlow responded with sympathetic articles in Der Reichswart that were subsequently re-printed in the communist central organ Rote Fahne. Later, he was to write approvingly of the Communist Party of Germany's domestic policies in the Deutsches Tageblatt and to demand fifty-percent managerial control of any enterprise by the workers. It is reported that Reventlow alone among the Nazi leaders was never booed when addressing crowds of workers.

== DVFP and NSDAP involvement ==
In 1924, Reventlow and Albrecht von Graefe broke from the German National People's Party (DNVP) to form the German Völkisch Freedom Party (DVFP) which was both more Völkish and left-wing than the conservative DNVP. Both men were elected as deputies to the Reichstag at the elections of May and December 1924. Reventlow first represented electoral constituency 13 (Schleswig-Holstein) and then was elected from the DVFP national electoral list. However, in May 1927, Reventlow quarreled with the more conservative Graefe and left the party to join the Nazi Party (NSDAP), bringing over his faction en bloc, including Wilhelm Kube, Christian Mergenthaler, Bernhard Rust and Franz Stöhr, each of whom were to enjoy prominent roles in their new party. This greatly improved the NSDAP position in northern Germany, where the DVFP had always been stronger than the NSDAP and, by the end of 1928, the DVFP had for all intents and purposes ceased to exist.

Reventlow's group quickly allied itself with the more socialistic wing of the NSDAP headed by Gregor Strasser, which favored genuine socialistic measures and an alliance with the Soviets against the western democracies. Though a power in the party, this group became less influential as Hitler turned to overt militarism and antisemitism after attaining power.

At the 1928 parliamentary election, Reventlow was elected from the NSDAP electoral list as one of the first 12 deputies elected to the Reichstag formally under the Nazi Party banner. He was continually reelected and retained his seat until his death, representing electoral constituency 2 (Berlin) from the July 1932 election onward.

Reventlow was never liked or trusted by Hitler, but his personal popularity was substantial and Hitler chose not to cross him but to ignore him. Reventlow was never given a high party office nor, after the seizure of power, was he given any government post. Though often critical of government policies, he was allowed to publish his newspaper, Der Reichswart, until his death in 1943.

== Antisemitism ==
Reventlow supported a theory first proposed by Lesley Fry (pen-name of Paquita de Shishmareff ) (1882-1970), who in her book Waters Flowing Eastward (Paris: Éditions R.I.S.S., 1931) made the false claim that the Protocols of the Elders of Zion were the master plan of a conspiracy. Fry portrayed the supposed plotted world domination as led by "cultural Zionist" Asher Ginzberg. On the contrary, Ginzberg supported an international Jewish cultural and political revival. In addition, Ginzberg did not entertain the thought of a single Jewish state. Reventlow named Fry as his source on the origins of the Protocols. After Philip Graves provided evidence in The Times that the Protocols were plagiarised forgery, Reventlow advocated Fry's faulty notion of Ginzberg's authorship in the periodical La Vieille France. Ginzberg's supporters sued Reventlow, who was forced to retract and pay damages. However he continued to propagate his views.

== Religious activism ==
Reventlow’s antisemitism was not racial, as was Hitler’s, but cultural, which led to his involvement with the German Faith Movement. From 1934 to 1936, Reventlow served as deputy chairman of this religious movement which postulated that every people "through its blood" developed its own religious knowledge. The movement was an anti-Christian attempt to create a "species-true faith" for Germany. He left the movement because of its anti-Christian stance.

== Works (in English translation) ==
- The Vampire of the Continent (1916) (translated by George Chatterton-Hill from the German original, titled: Der Vampir des Festlandes; eine Darstellung der englischen Politik nach ihren Triebkräften, Mitteln und Wirkungen (1915))
- "Where is God?" "Friends of Europe" publications; no. 47, London, 1937
- "The Neutrals In This War," Current History, a journal published by The New York Times, October 1915, p. 169-172.

== See also ==
- Joseph B. Neville, Jr., "Ernst Reventlow and the Weimar Republic: A Völkish Radical Confronts Germany’s Social Question," Societas 7, 1977, pp. 229–251.
- Conan Fischer, “The German Communists and the Rise of Nazism,” St. Martin's Press, New York City, 1991.
