= Völkisch-Social Bloc =

Right-wing Weimar German alliance

Poster of the Völkisch-Social Bloc for the Reichstag election of 1924.

The Völkisch-Social Bloc (German: Völkisch-Sozialer Block or Völkisch-Sozialer-Block, VSB or V-S-B) was a right-wing electoral alliance in post-World War I Germany. Its philosophy was loosely aligned with that of the NSDAP (Nazi Party). Anton Drexler was elected in February 1924 to the Landtag of Bavaria as a representative of the VSB. Artur Dinter was elected in February 1924 to the Landtag of Thuringia as a representative of the VSB. He was expelled from the party in December 1924.

Christian Mergenthaler was elected to the Landtag of the Free People's State of Württemberg in May 1924 as a representative of the VSB. Rudolf Jordan was active as a speaker for the VSB by 1924, although he was not a member. From 1923 to 1925, Josef Wagner was also a member of the VSB in the province of Westphalia.
