= National Socialist Freedom Movement =

Historical political party in Weimar Germany

National Socialist Freedom Movement Nationalsozialistische Freiheitsbewegung
- Leader: Albrecht von Graefe; Erich Ludendorff
- Founded: April 1924; 102 years ago
- Dissolved: 27 February 1925; 101 years ago
- Merger of: NSDAP and DVFP
- Merged into: NSDAP
- Paramilitary wing: Frontbann
- Ideology: Nazism; Pan-Germanism; Anti-communism; Antisemitism; Factions: Anti-Catholicism
- Political position: Far-right
- Colours: Brown

Party flag

The National Socialist Freedom Movement (German: Nationalsozialistische Freiheitsbewegung, NSFB) or National Socialist Freedom Party (German: Nationalsozialistische Freiheitspartei, NSFP) was a short-lived political party in Weimar Germany created in April 1924 during the aftermath of the Beer Hall Putsch. Adolf Hitler and many Nazi leaders were jailed after the failed coup attempt and the Nazi Party was outlawed in what came to be known as the "lean" or "wilderness years". The remaining Nazis formed the NSFB as a legal means of carrying on the party and its ideology. Included in this party was the similarly reformed and renamed Frontbann, which was a legal alternative to the SA.

Eugene Davidson notes that "[t]he Far Right could not agree on much of anything for long, not even on who was the chief enemy", with NSFP Reichstag deputy Reinhold Wulle believing that the Catholic Church was a greater danger than, Marxists and Jews. Wulle told a party gathering in January 1925 that Hitler would never again regain his former authority. Hitler himself had given up his leadership of the party during the duration of his imprisonment, telling people who came to see him that the grounds for his decision were that he was overworked writing a voluminous book. NSFP leaders Albrecht von Graefe and Erich Ludendorff both quit the NSFP in February 1925, only a little more than a year after it was founded.

On 27 February 1925, the Nazi Party was reformed after the ban expired in January and Hitler had been released from prison in December 1924. The NSFB was then reabsorbed into the Nazi Party.

== Election results ==
The NSFB formed an electoral alliance with Ludendorff's German Völkisch Freedom Party. In some districts, it was called the Völkisch-nationaler Block or Volksbloc. In the Bavarian elections of April 1924, the Volksbloc had been able to elect 23 of 129 deputies to the state legislature.

In the May 1924 elections, the NSFB won 32 seats in the Reichstag. The eminent World War I General Erich Ludendorff and former SA head Ernst Röhm and also Theodor Fritsch, Wilhelm Kube, Theodor Vahlen, Ernst Graf zu Reventlow, Albrecht von Graefe and Christian Mergenthaler were among the winning candidates. However, in the December 1924 elections the party lost 18 of these seats.

German Reichstag

Election year	Votes	%	Seats won	+/–	Notes
May 1924	1,918,329	6.5 (6th)	32 / 491	▲32	
December 1924	907,242	3.0 (8th)	14 / 491	▼18	
