= December 1924 German federal election =

- 7 December 1924

All 493 seats in the Reichstag 247 seats needed for a majority
- Registered: 38,987,324 (▲1.6%)
- Turnout: 78.8% (▲1.4pp)
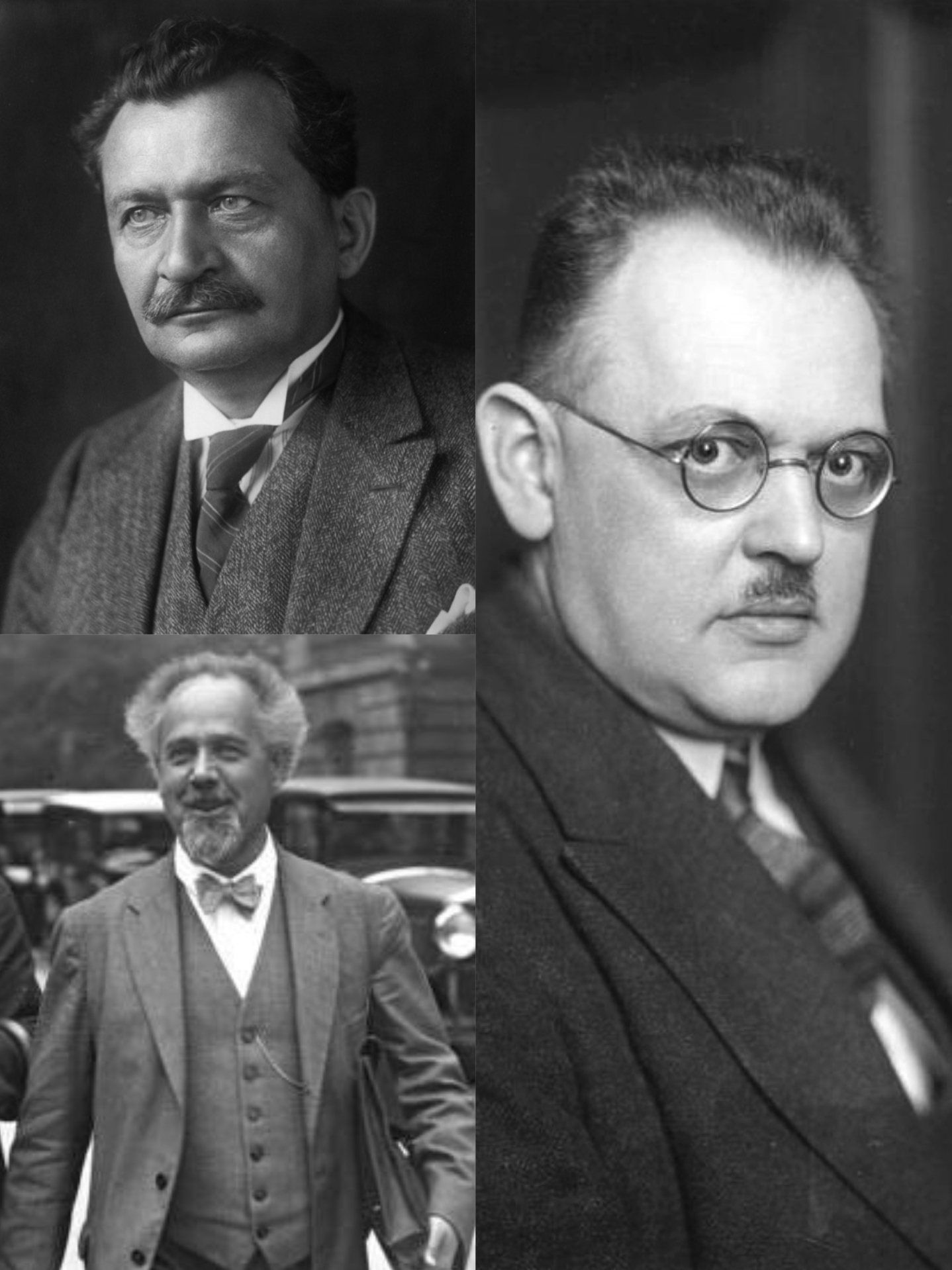

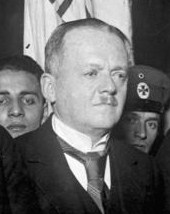

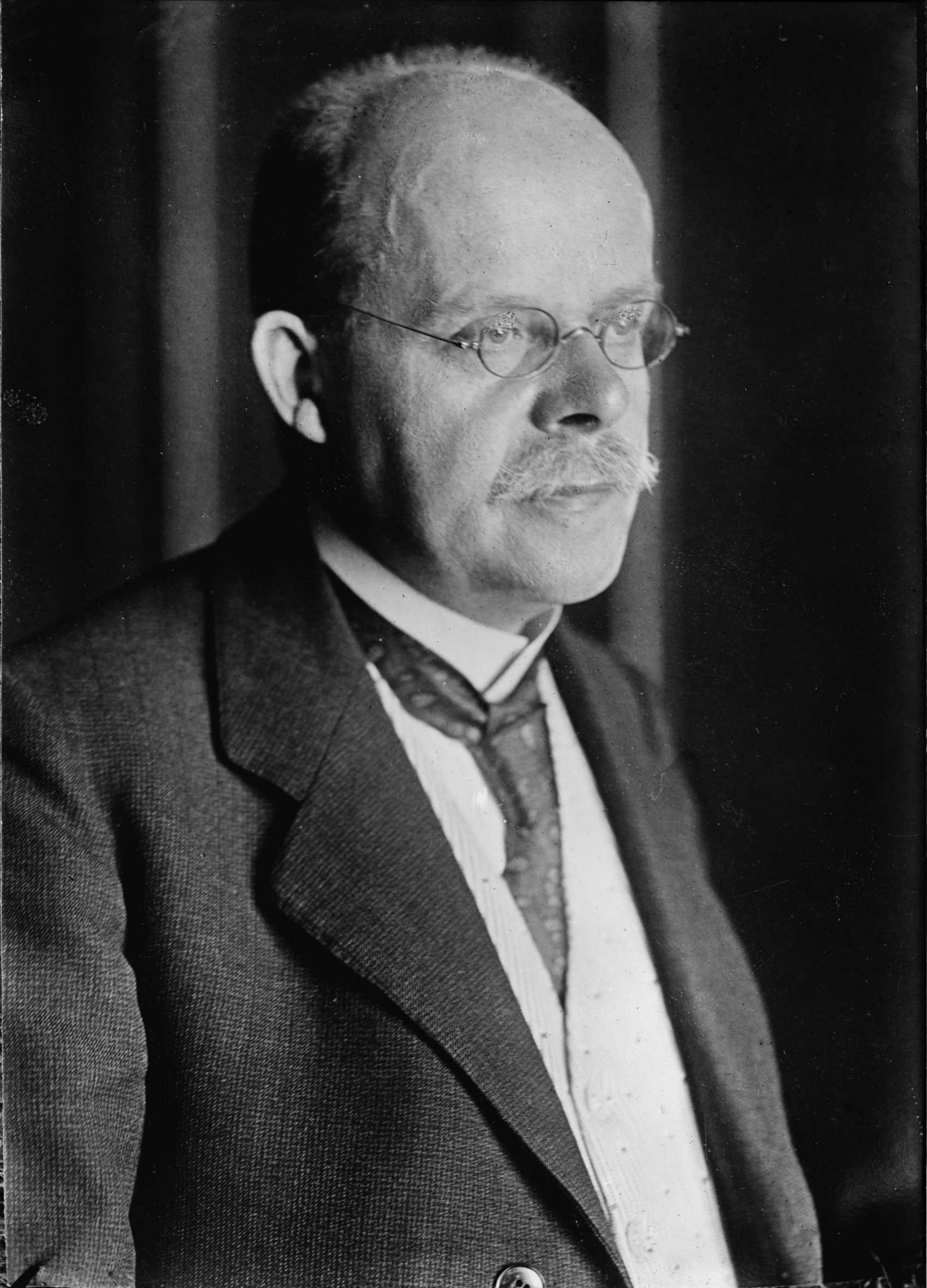

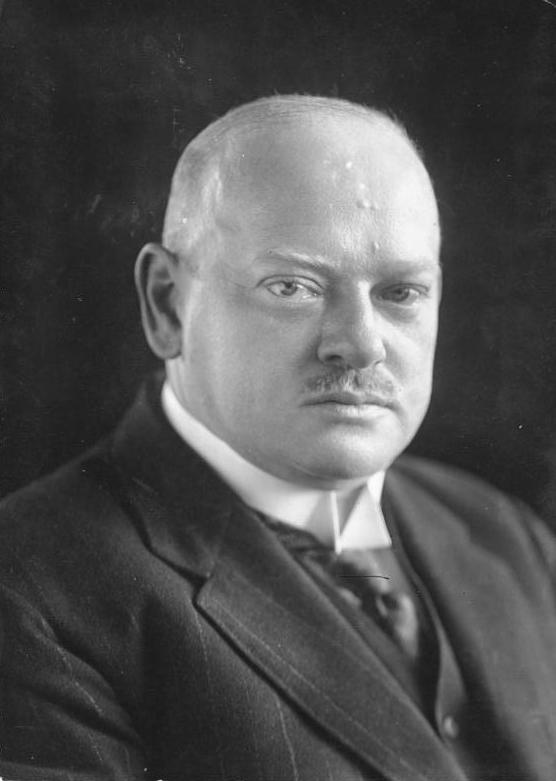

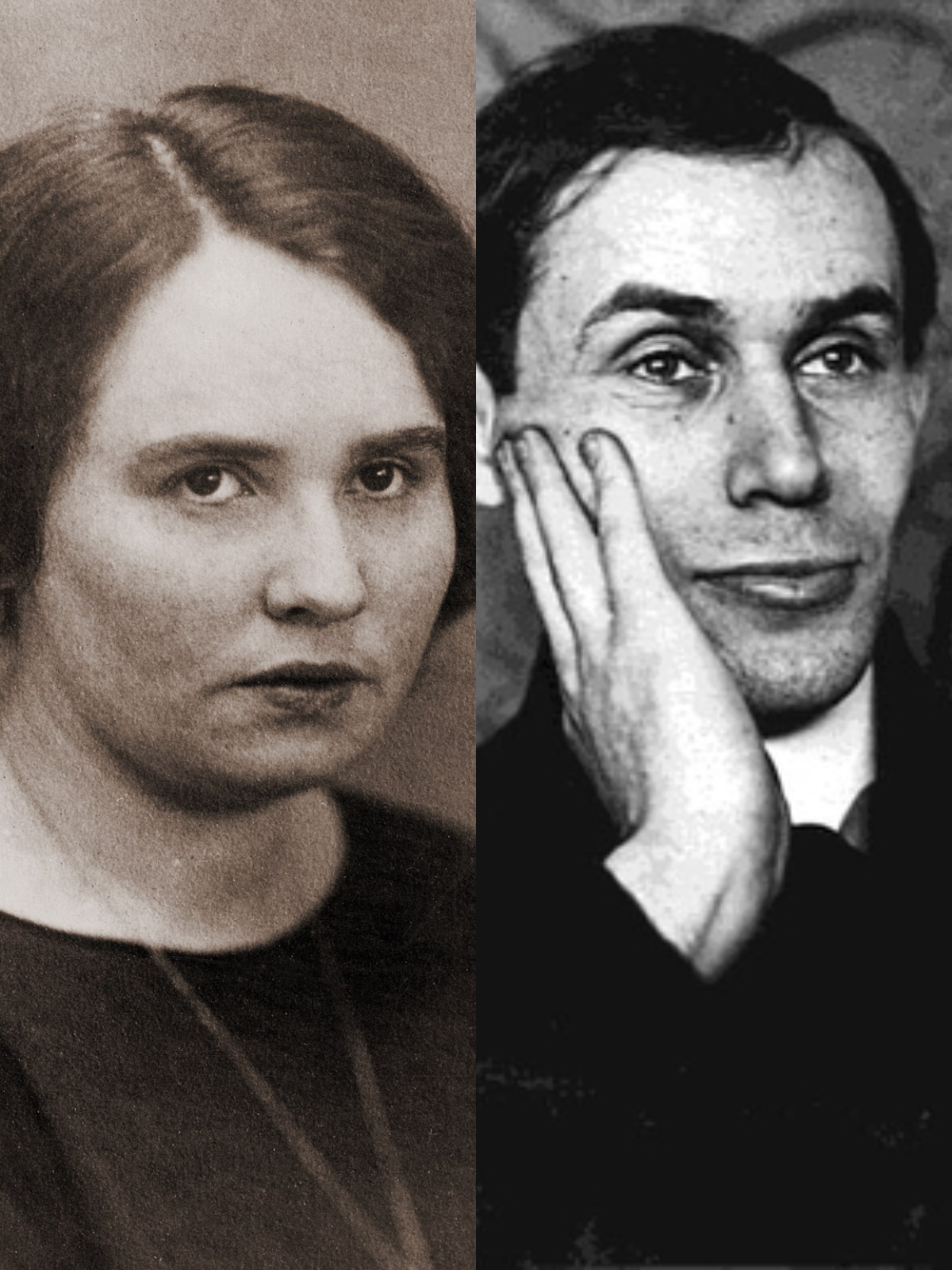

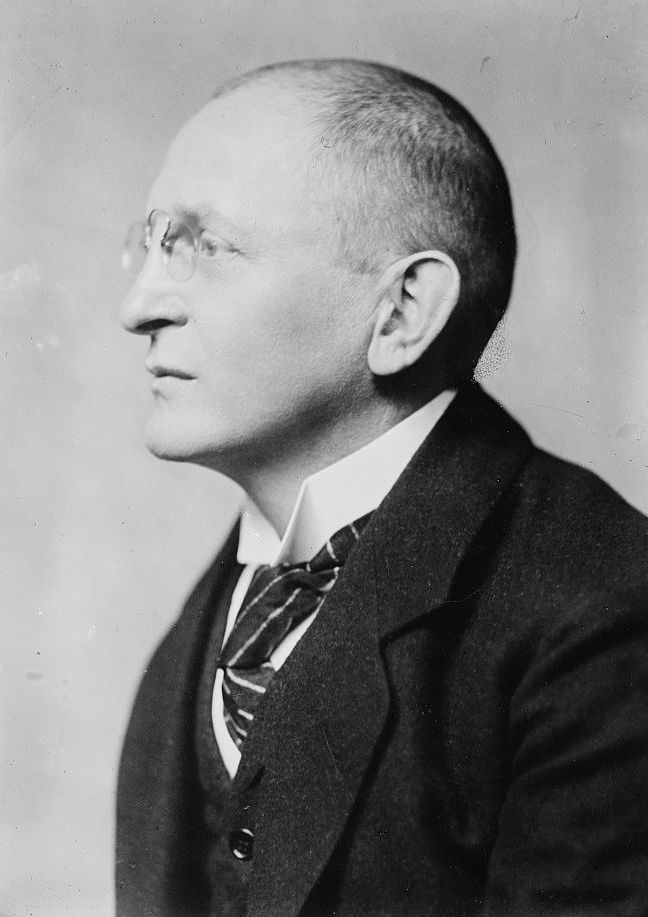
	First party	Second party	Third party
Leader	Hermann Müller; Otto Wels; Arthur Crispien	Kuno von Westarp	Wilhelm Marx
Party	SPD	DNVP	Centre
Last election	20.5%, 100 seats	19.5%, 95 seats	13.4%, 65 seats
Seats won	131	103	69
Seat change	▲31	▲8	▲4
Popular vote	7,881,041	6,205,802	4,118,849
Percentage	26.0%	20.5%	13.6%
Swing	▲5.5 pp	▲1.0 pp	▲0.2 pp
	Fourth party	Fifth party	Sixth party
Leader	Gustav Stresemann	Ruth Fischer & Arkadi Maslow	Erich Koch-Weser
Party	DVP	KPD	DDP
Last election	9.2%, 45 seats	12.6%, 62 seats	5.7%, 28 seats
Seats won	51	45	32
Seat change	▲6	▼17	▲4
Popular vote	3,049,064	2,709,086	1,919,829
Percentage	10.1%	8.9%	6.3%
Swing	▲0.9 pp	▼3.7 pp	▲0.6 pp
Government before election
Second Marx cabinet
Z–DVP–DDP
Government after election
First Luther cabinet
DVP–DNVP–Z–DDP–BVP

A federal election for the third Reichstag of the Weimar Republic was held in Germany on 7 December 1924. The parties of the far left and far right suffered significant losses in the voting, while the moderate left Social Democratic Party (SPD) made the greatest gains and remained the strongest party in the Reichstag. The negotiations for a ruling coalition nevertheless led to a shift to the right. The new government of the independent Hans Luther, a five-party centre-right coalition without the SPD, included the monarchist German National People's Party (DNVP) for the first time.

== Background ==
After the previous Reichstag election in May 1924, Chancellor Wilhelm Marx of the Catholic Centre Party stayed in office with a minority coalition of the Centre, German People's Party (DVP) and German Democratic Party (DDP). It controlled only 128 of the 472 seats in the Reichstag. The most crucial issue the government faced was passage of the Dawes Plan, an agreement with the Allies to resolve the problems surrounding Germany's World War I reparations. With the help of the Social Democrats (SPD) and half the members of the right-wing German National People's Party (DNVP), the Reichstag voted its approval on 29 August. Marx then attempted to expand his coalition to the right to include the DNVP, but the negotiations failed. In the hope of being able to form a broader coalition with a new Reichstag, Marx asked German President Friedrich Ebert to dissolve the Reichstag and call for another election.

== Campaign ==
Just over 50 parties and an estimated 4,638 candidates contested the election, although only eight of the parties were large enough to have a real chance at winning seats.

The Centre Party, DDP and SPD – the parties of the Weimar Coalition that had dominated the Weimar Republic's founding – competed as a bloc using the resources and membership of the defense organization Reichsbanner Schwarz-Rot-Gold, which the three parties had formed earlier in the year.

The second-strongest member of the governing coalition, the right of center DVP, tried to woo voters to it from both the center and the right. It emphasized nationalist and monarchists issues where the DNVP was a major competitor, whereas in strongholds of the DDP and Centre, it campaigned on issues such as the importance of duly implementing Germany's treaty agreements.

The DNVP announced its monarchism openly in its party program:

Our party remains as it was—monarchist and nationalist. Our aims are German and national. Our glorious colors are black, white, and red. Our will is firmer than ever to create a Germany free from Jewish and French domination, free from parliamentary cliques and the domination of capitalism—a Germany in which we and our children again proudly wish to do our duty.

The Communist Party of Germany (KPD), at the opposite end of the political spectrum, carried out a campaign of boisterous agitation, but it was handicapped by an improving economy and the many voters who had been alienated by its unruly tactics during the previous Reichstag session.

== Electoral system ==
The Reichstag was elected via party list proportional representation. For this purpose, the country was divided into 35 multi-member electoral districts. A party was entitled to a seat for every 60,000 votes won. This was calculated via a three-step process on the constituency level, an intermediate level which combined multiple constituencies, and finally nationwide, where all parties' excess votes were combined. In the third nationwide step, parties could not be awarded more seats than they had already won on the two lower constituency levels. Due to the fixed number of votes per seat, the size of the Reichstag fluctuated between elections based on the number of voters.

The voting age was 20 years. People who were incapacitated according to the Civil Code, who were under guardianship or provisional guardianship, or who had lost their civil rights after a criminal court ruling were not eligible to vote.

== Results ==
The clearest result of the election was a decline in strength in the parties of the far right and far left. The National Socialist Freedom Movement (NSFP), a combination of the Nazi Party and the German Völkisch Freedom Party formed after the two were banned as a result of the Beer Hall Putsch of November 1923, lost 18 seats, dropping from 32 to 14. The Communist Party, which fell from 62 to 45 seats, was the other major loser in the election.

The SPD made the largest gains, climbing from 100 to 131 seats. Much of the increase almost certainly came at the expense of the KPD. The DNVP added eight seats, and the Centre Party, DVP and DDP all saw smaller increases.

Party	Votes	%	+/–	Seats	+/–
Social Democratic Party	7,881,041	26.02	+5.50	131	+31
German National People's Party	6,205,802	20.49	+1.04	103	+8
Centre Party	4,118,849	13.60	+0.23	69	+4
German People's Party	3,049,064	10.07	+0.87	51	+6
Communist Party of Germany	2,709,086	8.94	−3.67	45	−17
German Democratic Party	1,919,829	6.34	+0.69	32	+4
Bavarian People's Party	1,134,035	3.74	+0.51	19	+3
National Socialist Freedom Movement	907,242	3.00	−3.55	14	−18
Economic Party of the German Middle Class	692,963	2.29	+0.58	12	+5
Agricultural League	500,525	1.65	−0.31	8	−2
Bavarian Peasant's and Middle Class Party	312,442	1.03	+0.37	5	+2
German-Hanoverian Party	261,549	0.86	−0.23	4	−1
German Social Party–Reichsbund für Aufwertung	159,115	0.53	−0.61	0	−4
Independent Social Democratic Party	98,842	0.33	−0.47	0	0
German Revaluation and Reconstruction Party	81,944	0.27	New	0	New
Polish People's Party	81,700	0.27	−0.07	0	0
Christian Social People's Community	41,530	0.14	−0.29	0	0
Free Economy Union F.F.F.	38,923	0.13	+0.01	0	0
Revaluation and Reconstruction Party (RWV 23)	33,656	0.11	New	0	New
Party for People's Welfare	32,496	0.11	New	0	New
Haeusser Alliance	9,747	0.03	−0.05	0	0
Wendish People's Party	5,585	0.02	−0.02	0	0
Schleswig Club	5,134	0.02	−0.01	0	0
German Christian People's Party	4,322	0.01	New	0	New
Deutschvölkische Reichspartei	3,405	0.01	New	0	New
Masurian Union	542	0.00	0.00	0	0
Reevaluation and Reconstruction Party	478	0.00	New	0	New
Tenants' Party	246	0.00	New	0	New
Total	30,290,092	100.00	–	493	+21
Valid votes	30,290,092	98.65			
Invalid/blank votes	414,934	1.35			
Total votes	30,705,026	100.00			
Registered voters/turnout	38,987,324	78.76			
Source: Gonschior.de

== Aftermath ==
Following the election, the balance of power lay with the DVP, which announced that it would only join a government of the bourgeois right, not a grand coalition that would include the SPD. Unlike after the May 1924 election, negotiations with the DNVP were successful, and in January a new majority cabinet was formed under Hans Luther – an independent close to the DVP – as a coalition of the Centre Party, DNVP, DVP, DDP and Bavarian People's Party. The Luther cabinet lasted just under 16 months.

All parties except the KPD had struggled to attract the youth vote. For some, the difficulty reflected the estrangement of the younger generation from the increasing materialism of German political life. For monarchists in the DNVP, it was a sign that perhaps their party’s quest for a restoration of the monarchy did not resonate as strongly with those who had grown up after the end of World War I.

== Works cited ==
- Childers, Thomas (1983). The Nazi Voter: The Social Foundations of Fascism in Germany, 1919-1933. University of North Carolina Press. ISBN 0807815705.
