= Albrecht von Graefe (politician) =

German politician

Member of the Reichstag (Weimar Republic)
- In office 1920–1928
- Constituency: National list (1924–1928); Mecklenburg (1920–1924)

(German Empire)
- In office 1912–1918

Personal details
- Born: 1 January 1868 Berlin
- Died: 18 January 1933 (aged 65) Benz, Wismar, Nazi Germany
- Party: German Conservative Party, German National People's Party, German Völkisch Freedom Party, National Socialist Freedom Movement
- Relations: Karl Ferdinand von Graefe (grandfather)
- Parent: Albrecht von Graefe
- Occupation: Landowner and army officer
- Known for: Politician

Albrecht von Graefe (1 January 1868 – 18 April 1933) was a German landowner and far-right politician active both during the German Empire and the Weimar Republic. Although never a member of the Nazi Party he was an early associate of Adolf Hitler and for a while appeared a credible rival for the leadership of the overall Völkisch movement.

== Early career ==
The son of the celebrated ophthalmologist Albrecht von Graefe, and thus grandson of the surgeon Karl Ferdinand von Graefe, he enlisted in the German Imperial Army as an officer in 1887. After his military service von Graefe entered politics and served as a deputy in the Reichstag for the German Conservative Party from 1912 to 1918.

== Rise to prominence ==
Von Graefe returned to the Reichstag in 1920 as member of the German National People's Party (DNVP). A close associate of Reinhold Wulle, von Graefe was on the far right of the DNVP and as early as 1920 the pair had held negotiations with Adolf Hitler. Between 1919 and 1920 von Graefe personally had come to prominence following the publication of a series of open letters in the German press in which his racialist and anti-Semitic views were attacked by the prominent liberal Gustav Stresemann.

In 1922 von Graefe, Wulle and Wilhelm Henning split from the DNVP to set up their own Völkisch party the German Völkisch Freedom Party (DVFP). The move came after Henning had written an article about Walther Rathenau that was so full of vitriol that Chancellor Joseph Wirth called on his DNVP coalition partners to purge themselves of their extremist members. Despite splitting from the DNVP von Graefe remained a member of the Reichstag and held his seat until 1928.

== Alliance with the Nazis ==
An early ally and rival to Hitler, he had managed to convince the Nazi Party leader that the two groups should limit themselves to certain spheres of influence, with the DVFP active in north Germany and the Nazis in the south. As a consequence of this alliance von Graefe marched in the front row of the Beer Hall Putsch. However he also took advantage of the aftermath by cultivating an alliance with Erich Ludendorff and using this in an attempt to take control of the far right for himself. By 1924 von Graefe had entered into negotiations with Gregor Strasser to absorb the Nazi Party into the DVFP. Although the plan had Ludendorff's backing it was vetoed by Hitler from prison as he had no desire to surrender leadership to von Graefe or anyone else. Nevertheless, a formal alliance that stopped just short of merger was agreed and von Graefe was a member of the Reich leadership of the resulting National Socialist Freedom Movement (NSFB).

However von Graefe was not a skilled leader and he bore the brunt of the failure of NSFB, which captured only 14 seats in the December 1924 election, a sharp decline in support for the far right. The group split in 1925, leading to von Graefe and Wulle reforming the DVFP and the establishment of a rivalry with the Nazis.

== Later years ==
Not long after the schism, von Graefe was injured at a speaking engagement in Frankfurt, in an apparent assassination attempt, when a heckler threw an explosive on stage, forcing the abandonment of the rally. In a 1937 meeting of the Reichstag, this attack was claimed —by Nazi party deputy, Adalbert Gimbel —as having been a strike against a potential rival movement. Hitler addressed an open letter to von Graefe in Völkischer Beobachter on 19 March 1926, in which Hitler warned that "I was once the drummer and will be the same in the future; but I shall drum only for Germany and not for you and your likes, so help me God". He left politics altogether in 1928 and died not long after Hitler came to power.
