= Christian Mergenthaler =

German Nazi politician (1884–1980)

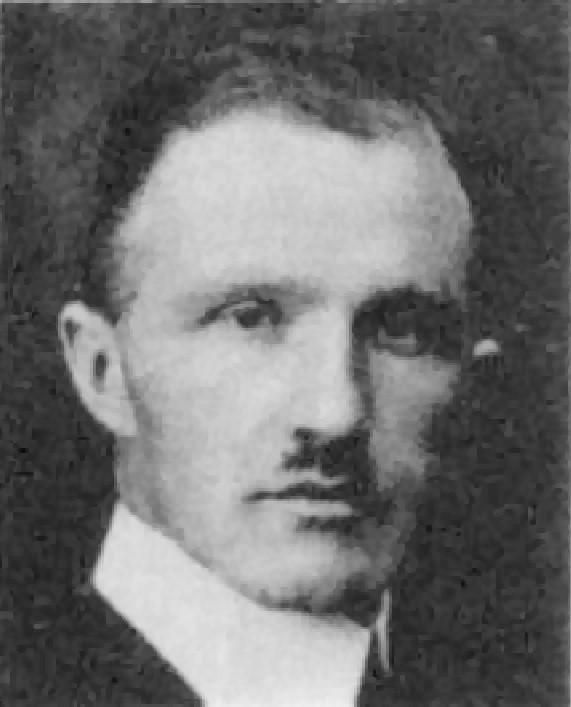
- Mergenthaler in 1924

7th Ministerpräsident of Württemberg
- In office 12 May 1933 – 21 April 1945
- Preceded by: Wilhelm Murr
- Succeeded by: Position abolished

Culture Minister, Württemberg
- In office 15 March 1933 – 21 April 1945
- Preceded by: Wilhelm Bazille
- Succeeded by: Position abolished

Justice Minister, Württemberg
- In office 15 March 1933 – 12 May 1933
- Preceded by: Josef Beyerle
- Succeeded by: Jonathan Schmid

Landtag President, Württemberg
- In office April 1932 – 15 March 1933
- Preceded by: Albert Pflüger
- Succeeded by: Jonathan Schmid

Additional positions
- 1924–1928 1929–1933: Württemberg Landtag Deputy
- 1924: Reichstag Deputy

Personal details
- Born: 8 November 1884 Waiblingen, Kingdom of Württemberg, German Empire
- Died: 11 September 1980 (aged 95) Bad Dürrheim, Baden-Württemberg, West Germany
- Party: Nazi Party
- Other political affiliations: National Socialist Freedom Party; Völkisch-Social Bloc
- Profession: Schoolteacher

Military service
- Allegiance: German Empire
- Branch/service: Imperial German Army
- Years of service: 1908–1909; 1914–1919
- Rank: Oberleutnant
- Unit: 13th (Hohenzollern) Foot Artillery Regiment; 24th Reserve Foot Artillery Regiment
- Battles/wars: World War I

Julius Christian Mergenthaler (8 November 1884 – 11 September 1980) was a German Nazi Party politician who served as the Ministerpräsident and culture minister of Württemberg for nearly the entire duration of Nazi Germany. He served as a deputy in the Württemberg Landtag for nine years, and in the Reichstag for one term. He was also a member of the Nazi paramilitary organization, the Sturmabteilung (SA), and rose to the rank of SA-Obergruppenführer. After the end of the Second World War, denazification proceedings judged him to be a major offender and he was interned for four years.

== Early life ==
Mergenthaler was born in the town of Waiblingen in Württemberg, the son of a baker. He attended the local Volksschule between 1894 and 1898 and then graduated from the Gymnasium in Bad Cannstatt in 1902. After studying mathematics and physics at the Technical University of Stuttgart, Tübingen University and the University of Göttingen, he passed the first service examination for secondary school teachers in 1907. He performed mandatory military service as a one-year volunteer between 1908 and 1909 with the 13th (Hohenzollern) Foot Artillery Regiment, headquartered in Ulm. He then passed the second state examination in 1911, and was employed as a senior teacher in the grammar and high schools in Leonberg. He returned to military service during the First World War as an artillery battery commander in the 24th Reserve Foot Artillery Regiment, much of that time at the front. After the end of the war, he left the army with the rank of Oberleutnant of reserves.

In 1920, Mergenthaler became a Gymnasium professor in the town of Schwäbisch Hall. A conservative German nationalist, with an antisemitic character, his radicalized war experience and sense of post-war social outrage led him to embrace extreme right-wing politics. He co-founded the local chapter of the Nazi Party in Schwäbisch Hall in 1922, and became heavily engaged in propaganda activities as a public speaker. After the Party was banned in 1923 following the failed Beer Hall Putsch, he joined the National Socialist Freedom Party (NSFP), a Nazi front organization. In May 1924, he was elected as a member of the Völkisch-Social Bloc (VSB) electoral alliance to a seat in the Württemberg Landtag (state parliament), which he would hold until 1928, and again from 1929 until the dissolution of that body by the Nazis in October 1933. He also won a seat in the Reichstag from electoral constituency 31 (Württemberg) but only served there until the next election in November 1924.

When the ban on the Nazis expired in 1925, the NSFP and the VSB were dissolved and many of its members rejoined the Nazi Party. Mergenthaler hesitated to do so until 1927 because he thought Adolf Hitler's dictatorial style was harmful to the cause. In a 1928 struggle for the key position of Party Gauleiter, Mergenthaler was outflanked by Wilhelm Murr, which resulted in a long-term rivalry between them with Mergenthaler holding the much less educated Murr in contempt. From 1929 to 1932, as the only Nazi Party deputy in the Landtag, he aggressively pursued the Party's goals.

== Career in Nazi Germany ==
At the 24 April state parliamentary election, the Nazis became the largest party in the Württemberg Landtag with 23 deputies, and Mergenthaler was elected president of that body. Following the national Nazi seizure of power in January 1933, Mergenthaler left his post as president of the parliament and was named Justice Minister and Culture Minister in the Württemberg cabinet formed by State President Murr on 15 March 1933. However, on 5 May, Hitler elevated Murr to the newly created position of Württemberg Reichsstatthalter (Reich Governor), and Mergenthaler succeeded him as head of the cabinet with the new title of Ministerpräsident, while also retaining the portfolio of Culture Minister.

Mergenthaler, since 1927, was also a long-serving member in the Party's paramilitary organization, the Sturmabteilung (SA), and he attained the rank of SA-Obergruppenführer in November 1938. He always wore his SA uniform at public events.

Clearly overshadowed by Murr, who held the highest Party and governmental posts, Mergenthaler nonetheless remained influential in his position as culture minister. His tenure in this post saw the creation of a new college for primary school teachers, the building of schools for gifted elementary students in rural areas and the expansion of vocational training. These seemingly progressive reforms were accompanied by a strict enforcement of Nazism in school management. He ruthlessly pursued teachers and principals who did not follow Nazi ideology, either transferring or removing them from their jobs. Young teachers were under particularly massive pressure to join the Nazi Party.

Mergenthaler also led a fierce "ideological struggle" with the Church, especially the Evangelical-Lutheran Church in Württemberg and its bishop, Theophil Wurm. For this, he specifically used the schools as a weapon. Mergenthaler intervened in parochial schools and banned teaching of parts of the Bible that he thought contrary to the "moral sense of the Germanic race", cut State contributions to the churches, forbade pastors who had not pledged allegiance to Hitler and, in 1939, finally ordered the introduction of a Nazi-tinged "Intuitive World Curriculum" in place of all religious education. His harsh crackdown created confusion and discord, hurting his cause more than helping it. At the local level, his actions led to bitter conflicts between the Church, the Nazi Party and the school bureaucracy which alienated the devout population of Württemberg. His most extreme measures were even curtailed by Gauleiter Murr and the national Nazi government.

== Post-war life ==
During the Second World War, the Württemberg capital, Stuttgart, fell to the French Liberation Army on 21 April 1945. Mergenthaler fled but was located and arrested. From 1945 to 1949, he was interned at Balingen, a French internment facility established at a subcamp of the former Nazi Natzweiler-Struthof concentration camp. In his 1948 denazification trial, Mergenthaler was judged to be a Hauptschuldiger (major offender) and he did not appeal this verdict. After release, he secluded himself in his house in Korntal and was no longer seen in public. In 1951, he received a living allowance and, after being pardoned in 1953, a full teacher's pension. He moved to Bad Dürrheim in 1977 where he died in September 1980.

== See also ==
- List of minister-presidents of Baden-Württemberg
- List of presidents of the Landtag of the Free People's State of Württemberg
- History of Württemberg

== Sources ==
- Information about Christian Mergenthaler in the Reichstag database
- Rudolf Kieß: "Christian Mergenthaler. Württembergischer Kultminister 1933-1945", in: Zeitschrift für Württembergische Landesgeschichte 54 (1995), p. 281-332.
- Rudolf Kieß: "Mergenthaler, Christian Julius, Physik- und Mathematiklehrer an höheren Schulen, MdL, MdR - NSDAP, Württembergischer Ministerpräsident und Kultminister", in: Bernd Ottnad (ed.): Baden-Württembergische Biographien, Vol. 2, Stuttgart 1999, p. 317-320.
- Rudolf Kieß: "Christian Mergenthaler (1884-1980)", in: R. Lächele, J. Thierfelder (eds.): Wir konnten uns nicht entziehen. Dreißig Porträts zu Kirche und Nationalsozialismus in Württemberg, Stuttgart 1998, p. 159-174.
- Ernst Klee: Das Personenlexikon zum Dritten Reich. Wer war was vor und nach 1945, Fischer-Taschenbuch-Verlag, Frankfurt-am-Main, 2007, p. 44. ISBN 978-3-596-16048-8.
- Michael D. Miller & Andreas Schulz: Gauleiter: The Regional Leaders of the Nazi Party and Their Deputies, 1925–1945, Volume 2 (Georg Joel - Dr. Bernhard Rust), R. James Bender Publishing, 2017, ISBN 978-1-932-97032-6.
- Frank Raberg: Biographisches Handbuch der württembergischen Landtagsabgeordneten 1815–1933. (Kohlhammer: Stuttgart, 2001) ISBN 3-17-016604-2, p. 562.
- Martin Schumacher, Katharina Lübbe, Wilhelm Heinz Schröder: Members of the Weimar Republic in the Nazi Reichstag Parliament 1933-1945. A Biographical Documentary. 3rd Edition (Düsseldorf: Droste, 1994) ISBN 3-7700-5183-1.
- Erich Stockhorst: 5000 heads - Who Was Who in the Third Reich (Kiel: Arndt, 2000), p. 291. ISBN 3-88741-116-1.
- Michael Stolle: "Der schwäbische Schulmeister Christian Mergenthaler, Württembergischer Ministerpräsident, Justiz- und Kulturminister," in: M. Kießener, J. Scholtyseck (eds.): Die Führer der Provinz. NS-Biographien aus Baden und Württemberg, p. 445-477.
