= Eugen Nesper (agent) =

German double agent and communist activist

- Born: 2 August 1913; Aufhausen (Aalen), Württemberg, Germany
- Occupations: Mechanic; Communist activist Communist paramilitary Double agent, working for German and Soviet security services
- Spouse: y

Eugen Nesper (born 2 August 1913) was a young mechanic who became interested in politics early on, joining the Young Communists when he was 16. His first experience of the inside of a jail came in 1932, even before the Hitler government had taken power, and was the result of political activism that included leafleting. After 1933 he was subject to security service surveillance, and in 1935 was invited for a meeting with the Stuttgart police chief, Friedrich Mußgay. He was given the option of working as an informant/agent for the Gestapo. There was an alternative available, which would involve concentration camp detention. Nesper agreed to the first option, but he did not lose instantly all his existing political beliefs. Some sources suggest that he hoped to be able to "help his friends" by having a closer and more open relationship with the Gestapo. He has come to be classified as a double agent. He is best remembered for his role in the betrayal in 1944 of the group around the resistance activist Friedrich Schlotterbeck and his family.

== Life ==
=== Provenance and politicisation ===
Born at Aufhausen (Aalen) in the hill country east of Stuttgart, one year before the outbreak of the First World War, Eugen Nesper was a member of the generation politicised and radicalised by the worldwide Great Depression. In 1929, already a qualified metal worker, he joined the Young Communists, aged just 16. Two years later, in 1931, he joined the paramilitary Roter Frontkämpferbund, which had close links to the Communist Party and which had already, in May 1929, been outlawed by the Interior Minister, controversially invoking Article §235 of the constitution in the aftermath of the so-called Bloody May riots in Berlin. Membership of the Roter Frontkämpferbund seems to have brought him into contact with more uncompromisingly militant communists than he had encountered up to this time. When he was arrested in 1932, however, it was not for membership of an illegal paramilitary organisation, but in connection with a leafleting campaign involving "militant" printed material, calling on readers to join the fight against fascism ("... zum Kampf gegen den Faschismus"). A two-month prison sentence resulted.

=== 1933-1934: The first of the Hitler years: arrest, release, surveillance ===
In January or February 1933 he was again arrested and spent, this time, six months the jail at Rottenburg. The charge on which he was convicted was "Breach of the Peace" ("Landfriedensbruch"). His arrest followed a shooting incident as part of an attack on "Nazi" paramilitaries. The court was told he had beaten people up during the course of the altercation, thrown stones and called out incendiary phrases of encouragement such as "schlagt die Nazis tot" ("beat the Nazis to death"). From this final piece of evidence the court was invited to infer that he was no mere participant in the violence, but a communist ring leader.

During the second half of 1934, following his release from jail, Nesper underwent a lengthy meeting with Officer Frank, a senior officer at the main police station in nearby Schwäbisch Gmünd. Frank also urged him to resist the blandishments of the reds, and suggested that he might do better to become a leader with the local Hitler Youth. At this point it is clear that Nesper had not thrown in his lot with National Socialism. During his meeting with Frank it became apparent that the local police had extensive files on most of his political activism before 1933. The only important detail of which they were evidently completely unaware was his involvement with the paramilitary Roter Frontkämpferbund. Nesper concluded that of all the political allies and comrades with whom he had been involved, only those in the RFB were to be trusted. He relocated to Stuttgart and took a job.

=== 1935-1940: Stuttgart years: Gestapo agent or double agent? ===
In Stuttgart he rented a room with the family of Gotthilf Schlotterbeck, whose links with the Communist Party went back many years. The author and resistance activist Friedrich Schlotterbeck was a son of Gotthilf Schlotterbeck. It has never become clear just why, how and when Nesper became a Gestapo informant. A similar absence of clarity surrounds various aspects of his biography. It seems likely that the development was an iterative one, occurring over many months. A number of Gestapo employees subsequently stated that Nesper was already supplying information before the end of 1934. Irrespective of any information he may have provided to members of the security services in 1934, he clearly appeared on the radar for the senior political police authorities in what was by that time his home city, Stuttgart.

That summer a man called Berkhemer who was, or at least had been, a communist, and whom he already knew, approached Nesper, asking him to arrange for Berkhemer to meet the wife of Alfred Haag. The Haags were both known to have been communist politicians and activists before 1933 and it is probable that by the time Berkhemer made his request, Alfred Haag himself had already been arrested and was being held at the Oberer Kuhberg concentration camp. Nesper mentioned that matter to Gotthilf Schlotterbeck, in whose home he was still lodging. Schlotterbeck knew already from his own contacts that Berkhemer had become a police spy, and shared his knowledge with Nesper who was able to warn Lina Haag against Berkhemer appropriately. Berkhemer evidently worked out what had happened and informed his contacts in the police department of it. A few days later Eugen Nesper received an invitation to a meeting with Kriminalrat Friedrich Mußgay. Friedrich Mußgay had worked for the police service in Stuttgart since 1917 and then, having joined the party in May 1933 and switched to the political police department for the region that same year: by the end of 1935 he had become head of the "political police" and of police intelligence for the entire Württemberg region. It was at the meeting with Mußgay that Nesper found himself presented with two mutually exclusive options. He could co-operate with the security services or he could be sent to a concentration camp. Nesper chose the first option, while hoping that he would be able to continue to be helpful to comrades. Mußgay passed Nesper a list of names. These were Communist Party members and people of interest to the authorities. Helpfully, Nesper found that they were all people whom he already knew. He was to provide regular reports on each of these once every two or three months. After 1945 Nesper would recall that in each of his reports he had written the same formulaic couple of lines: the individual in question no longer wanted to know anything about politics and was no longer [politically] active. Two generations later, commentators highlight the extent to which Nesper's own recall of his years as a double agent was necessarily incomplete.

He would later make out that between 1935 and 1945 he operated successfully as a double agent. From the Gestapo he received information about arrests and convictions that he was able to pass on to comrades. As a trusted Gestapo informant he was able to move around freely, making it far easier than it otherwise would have been to deliver illegal material effectively, sustain a network of connections, and distribute money provided by the Moscow backed "Rote Hilfe" welfare organisation to concentration camp inmates. In the case of illegal written material - anti-government political leaflets - he was able to pass some of it to Gestapo handlers, and distribute the rest to appreciative comrades. This is not entirely incompatible with other surviving reports and records, which indicate that during the later 1930s Nesper became a reliable and valued informant. He reported regularly to his Gestapo handler, Karl Maile, on his financial dealings with Communist comrades. The two became friends. From the other side of the political divide, the Communist Party functionary Paul Meuter would later recall the remarkable frequency with which Nesper visited Zürich "disguised as a skier" between 1936 and 1938. The fact that the political police in Württemberg were exceptionally well-informed on all the details of the reorganisation being attempted at that time by the communist "Rote Hilfe" welfare organisation almost certainly tracks back directly to information received from Nesper.

=== 1940-1942: German army ===
During the summer of 1940 Nesper was conscripted into the German army. He fought initially on the western front and then on the eastern front. During August 1942 he managed to make his way across the lines to the Soviet side. For the next five months he was a Soviet prisoner of war, held in a camp at Sverdlovsk ("Свердловск" - as Yekaterinburg had been known before 1924, and would again become known after 1991). Nesper's explanations and shared insights evidently had been checked out satisfactorily against information from other sources: towards the end of 1942 he was transferred to Moscow, where questioning continued at the Lubyanka. Nesper's NKVD interrogators were particularly interested to know every detail of concerning his work as a "Gestapo spy".

=== 1943: An offer from the NKVD ===
After a little while Nesper was asked if he would be prepared to undertake a foreign mission. He agreed to the assignment, which involved returning to Stuttgart and transmitting reports to Moscow on the economic and social situation n Germany. His contacts in Moscow were also concerned to find out more about any resistance activities and the outcomes of any military sabotage missions undertaken by under cover comrades in Germany. It turned out that the mission was part of an Anglo-Soviet programme undertaken under the code name "Операции Айгер" / "Operation Eiger". According to at least one source, it was necessary to involve the British because at this time the Soviets had no suitable aircraft capable of flying from the Soviet Union to the Stuttgart region and back again without a refueling stop. Solo missions of this nature under Soviet auspices would have been unusual, and Nesper was to be the junior member of a two-man team. His comrade, Hermann Kramer, was also originally from Stuttgart. A committed communist, Kramer had been captured by the German authorities during or soon after 1933, but by 1936 he had escaped from the concentration camp to which he had been sent, and made his way to Spain where between 1936 and 1938 he fought in the Spanish Civil War. Before the outbreak of war Kramer had already settled at Chelyabinsk in the Soviet Union and started to build a new life for himself as an ordinary worker, employed at the city's tractor plant.

=== 1943-1944: Parachute agent ===
Between January and October 1943 comrades Kramer and Nesper underwent an extensive training programme in Moscow to prepare them for their new roles as "parachute agents". They were provided with false identities and complete sets of new identity papers, along with safe "starting point" addresses in Stuttgart. In October 1943 Kramer and Nesper embarked from Murmansk for the British Scapa Flow naval base on the British Orkney Islands, where they arrived on 11 November. From there they were transferred to London in England where the British Secret Intelligence Service completed their training. The Soviets did not trust their British allies either with the men's true identities nor with the code names they had been using in the Soviet Union. Instead, they were presented with the identities used for the false identity documents intended for subsequent use in Germany. Hermann Kramer was presented to the British as 35-year-old Ivan Johann Herbert (Note: At least one English-language source gives the cover name used for Hermann Kramer not as "Ivan Johann Herbert" but as "Johann Gerbert".) and 30-year-old Eugen Hesper was presented as 45-year-old Georg Schmidt. They both arrived in London with cover stories based - selectively - on aspects of their actual biographies.

In addition to completing their training, the British supplied Nesper and Kramer with further necessities, including 5,000 ℛ︁ℳ︁ and a lesser quantity each of US Dollars, sterling and Swiss francs. The money came with some food, German food coupons, army maps, Mauser pistols with ammunition, a couple of hand grenades and a suicide pill. During the very early morning of 8 January 1944 Nesper and Kramer made successful parachute jumps from a British war plane that had taken off from an airfield in Bedfordshire a few hours earlier, landing near Hechingen, in the hills some 40 miles south of Stuttgart. The flight crew waited till they were satisfied that all three parachutes had opened and then headed back to England.

The third parachute carried the men's luggage, which consisted principally of a large radio receiver/transmitter. It landed on a hillside approximately 150 meters from where the men landed. As they went to collect it, it became obvious that their descent had been spotted by an air defence unit, and they found themselves under fire. In the gun fight that ensued a part of Kramer's nose was shot away: despite being gravely wounded he continued to fire his pistol towards the direction from which they were being shot, and he thereby permitted Nesper to escape before he was himself captured. Nesper made his way to Stuttgart, despite an extensive manhunt in the area. Kramer was probably executed later.

=== 1944: Agent in Stuttgart ===
The safe "starting point" address in Stuttgart which he had been given before leaving Moscow was actually the family home of Gotthilf Schlotterbeck, in which Nesper had been a lodger before the war. He arrived unencumbered by baggage, having been unable to bring his luggage (including the Soviet radio apparatus) when he escaped from the drop point to Stuttgart, but Schlotterbeck had his own underground network of contacts through which Nesper was nevertheless able to send to Moscow a report of the accident that had befallen Kramer and himself on landing. The security services had already received intelligence that Nesper was to be smuggled into the Stuttgart area as an Anglo-Soviet spy. Possibly as a result of something Kramer had said under interrogation and/or possibly from other sources, they had very quickly identified Nesper as the man who had got away from the drop point: they therefore took the precaution of placing his wife's home in the city under covert surveillance: Nesper seems not to have been aware of this. He stayed with the Schlotterbnecks for long enough to brief Gotthilf's sons, Hermann and Friedrich Schlotterbeck, in some detail about his time in Moscow and in London, and then made his way to his wife's apartment, where he remained undisturbed for several days.

A few days later Nesper was arrested in the street, close to his wife's place of work. What happened over the next few hours, days and weeks is indicative as much of what remain unknown about Nesper as of what is on the record. Nesper would have been trained by the Soviets and the British to resist arrest under the circumstances. He still had his pistol, while the Gestapo officer arresting him was unarmed. One reason he did not attempt to get away was presumably that the officer who had been sent to find him was Karl Maile, the same Gestapo officer - albeit now with a more senior position - who in the 1930s had been Nesper's interlocutor-handler on behalf of the security services. Maile had been, and still remained, one of the most trusted senior officers working under Friedrich Mußgay, the regional head of criminal policing.

The arrest by Maile of Eugen Nesper unleashed an immediate and bitter turf war between Friedrich Mußgay's political police service in Württemberg and Himmler's "Reichssicherheitshauptamt" which claimed for itself a national, and indeed international remit, when it came to fighting the enemies of the state. Two months later that had extended to a confrontation over the Nesper case between the Gestapo and "Wehrmachtsabwehrstelle V", a military defence department. As soon as Maile had arrested Nesper he took him to see Obersturmbannführer Friedrich Mußgay who greeted him like an old friend, assuring him that the Stuttgart police had everything in hand and that his friend - Hermann Kramer - was alive and being held in police custody. In the same spirit of friendship he continued to set out a new pair of options for Nesper. The choice, now, was between co-operation and death. Mußgay had a plan, based on the mission that the Soviets had assigned to Nesper. He was to make his regular reports to Moscow as previously envisaged, but his reports would be based not on what he was able to pick up, but on information - much of it false - provided by the Gestapo. The choice that Mußgay offered was a brutal one, but it was probably more attractive than the outlook faced by the other Soviet parachute agents who landed in Germany and were arrested. There were about fifty of them. Most were held in solitary confinement (and then killed) while the rest their movements rigorously monitored at every turn. Eugen Nesper, who evidently chose co-operation with Mußgay's plan rather than death, was released, and sent to live in an SS accommodation block where he lived with Carl Maile. The arrangement did not entirely suit either man, and later Nesper went back to live with his wife. Maile came too, setting up home in the front room.

Mußgay had a second set of tasks in mind for Nesper. The Stuttgart police were still troubled by the subversive campaign being waged by "communists". The Communist Party had been outlawed in 1933, but many members remained "active underground" as part of an anti-government resistance network. Mußgay and Nesper both knew that many of the individuals involved in the Stuttgart region were Nesper's friends and/or former comrades. Nesper was to report regularly on these people. It was partly because Mußgay knew he would need to obtain authorization from Berlin to employ Nesper as he wished that Nesper was detained under an informal arrangement that involved remaining at liberty, albeit with Karl Maile in constant attendance. A more conventional approach would have involved simply introducing him at once into the criminal justice system. Details could then be logged and, in due course, accessed by Berlin. In the case of Eugen Nesper, Obersturmbannführer Mußgay was in no great hurry to work through the various procedures required of him.

As the dual set of tasks for which Mußgay was using Nesper became evident to other branches of homeland security, they did indeed trigger intensifying opposition from rival departments. There were inherent risks that the radio transmissions to Moscow for the Gestapo and the surveillance of local communist resistance cells for Mußgay would lead to unanticipated operational conflicts. In order to try and keep the operation to himself, Mußgay instructed Nesper to deliver his reports o comrades not to the main police building but to a separate "N-Referat" ("Nesper department") in a little building halfway along the "Kronprinzstraße" ("Crown Prince Street"). The work involved re-establishing and maintaining closer contacts with his old friends, the Schlotterbecks, and the little group of friends and acquaintances working with them. The "political work" in which the Schlotterbeck group was known to engage involved gathering information about war-related industries, military codes and other communication modalities, about civilian morale, and about conditions in Germany more generally. They then communicated this "intelligence information" to the government's enemies in Moscow and London, using such methods as they could find. One of the details on which Mußgay was keen to find out more involved whether and how much the Schlotterbecks knew about the two Soviet parachute agents who had appeared in the hills south of Stuttgart the previous month.

In February 1944, roughly four weeks after his first visit in more than four years, Nesper turned up again at the Schlotterbeck home, explaining that he had found the most important parts of his radio apparatus and would soon be in a position to undertake his reporting assignments for Moscow after all. Over the next few months he was able to keep in close contact with the SDchlotterbeck family, and indeed met some of their friends.

=== Karl Stäbler ===
During March 1944 one of the members of the Schlotterbeck group whom Nesper met was a soldier called Karl Stäbler. Stäbler had been stationed nearby in an Army Convalescence Unit and was working as a radio operator. Invoking his evident credentials with the Gestapo, Nesper was able to get the man to disclose to him numerous military secrets, including secret communication codes. Even if the details might have been individually trivial, their cumulative effect came to the attention of the army authorities, who then became keen to have Stäbler arrested at once. Arresting Stäbler would have interfered with various otherwise unrelated Gestapo operations, however. The case therefore led to renewed conflict between the army and the Gestapo. In the immediate term Mußgay was able to insert himself and use his authority to resolve the matter. In the end Karl Stäbler was assigned to serve on the Russian front, after a few weeks of compulsory service leave in Stuttgart. On the way back to Russia, he was to be arrested by the Gestapo. Mußgay reported these plans back to Nesper and Nesper passed the information back to the Schlotterbecks: they, presumably, included in it a report to Moscow. Knowingly or recklessly, by confiding the information on Stäbler's intended arrest to Nesper Mußgay ensured that Nesper was unable to ignore the increasing dangers of his own position. (Note: Another source indicates that Nesper came to learn of Stäbler's intended arrest not through an informal briefing from Friedrich Mußgay but through an indiscretion by Karl Maile. The two explanations are not incompatible. From one or other or both sources Nesper became aware of the Gestapo plan for Stäbler's arrest.)

=== Flight to(wards) Switzerland ===
In view of the deteriorating situation, in June 1944 Eugen Nesper decided that the time had come to tell Friedrich Schlotterbeck that he had been reporting on the family's resistance activities to the Gestapo ever since his arrival back in Germany in January 1944.{{efn According to one relatively recent source, Nesper admitted that he had been spying on he Schlotterbecks for the Gestapo only after he had been confronted by Friedrich Schlotterbeck with his suspicions to this effect.}} The ensuing conversation continued through most of the night, lasting approximately seven hours. Nesper probably admitted that he had already been active as a Gestapo spy when he had been the Schlotterbecks' lodger in the later 1930s. The meeting concluded with the decision that the time had come to escape across the Swiss border to the south.

The plan was for the Schlotterbeck brothers and two other comrades believed to be most at risk to escape in two pairs. Friedrich Schlotterbeck, who had been freed after slightly under ten years in "protective custody" at Welzheim in August 1943, (Note: According to at least one source Friedrich Schlotterbeck was released in August 1943 "in the hope that he would become a Gestapo spy". It did not happen, however.) would cross into Switzerland with Else Himmelheber, a comrade who had become Friedrich's fiancée a few months following his release. Friedrich's brother, Hermann Schlotterbeck, would cross with Karl Stäbler. In the event Friedrich Schlotterbeck was the only one of the four who managed to reach Switzerland. He would learn the fate of his family, fiancée and other activist comrades only after the war ended. Stäbler was shot as he attempted to cross the border, but he escaped capture and made his way back to Stuttgart where he spent the rest of the war hiding successfully from the authorities in a shed on a comrade's vineyard on the city's edge.

=== A price to be paid for Nesper's treachery ===
On 10 June Eugen Nesper failed to arrive for a scheduled appointment with Alfred Hagenlocher, his Gestapo counter-intelligence interlocutor at the time. At around the same time reports came in to the effect that Friedrich Schlotterbeck and his fiancée had disappeared. The coincidence immediately triggered loud warning bells. Shortly afterwards a report came in on the radio that a border official had been shot: the report came with a description of the shooter. It sounded like a description of Eugen Nesper. Hagenlocher and Mußgay informed the "Reichssicherheitshauptamt" (RHSA) in Berlin by radio and lost no time in organising a manhunt for Nesper and Schotterbeck.

For Mußgay the escape of the two main protagonists in one of his surveillance schemes represented a significant personal setback: he now feared disciplinary sanctions emanating from Berlin. For its part, the RHSA gave orders for the strongest possible measures to be taken against anyone associated with Eugen Nesper. That meant the Schlotterbecks and their antifascist associates. On 10 June 1944 Gotthilf and Marie Schlotterbeck, the parents, were arrested. Also arrested at the same Luginsland address was their daughter Gertrud Lutz who was visiting with her infant daughter Wilfriede. The two year-old Wilfriede was removed to a children's home at Waiblingen. That same day, in another part of town, Erich Heinser, Emil Gärttner und Sophie Klenk (the girl-friend of Hermann Schlotterbeck) were arrested at the Kodak factory. Hermann Seitz was detained one day later. His sister-in-law, Emmy Seitz, worked out of town at Hofheim-am-Taunus (near Frankfurt) but was arrested and transferred to Stuttgart to be dealt with alongside the others. Her husband, Theodor Seitz, was a soldier: he was arrested by an agency of the army department. Else Himmelheber managed to avoid the initial series of arrests, but was then "picked up" by a police patrol near Aalen a couple of weeks later.

The brutal interrogation sessions to which the detainees were subjected involved torture. The prisoners were then distributed across a number of different prisons, but all remained under direct Gestapo surveillance and control. From Berlin, the RHSA had directed that all should be held in solitary confinement. During the next few weeks, at their Stuttgart main office in the former "Hotel Silber", Mußgay's political police prepared a series of reports for the RHSA which were submitted to Berlin with a "Sonderbehandlung" ("Special Treatment") application, the granting of which would provide for the prisoners to be "extrajudicially executed". The reply came through immediately, by "express mail". Ten prisoners were named for "liquidation": Gotthilf and Maria Schlotterbeck, Gertrud Lutz (born Schlotterbeck), Else Himmelheber, Erich Heinser, Emil Gärttner, Sofie Klenk, Emmy Seitz, Hermann Seitz and Frida Schwille. They were all transferred to Dachau concentration camp, near Munich, on 29 November 1944. Earky the following morning, they were taken to the camp's execution area and killed by shooting.

The "political police" for Gau Württemberg and the RHSA were both keen - each for their own reasons - that the Schlotternbeck group "members" should be executed without any trial. The only charges available would include an indictment involving "high treason", in which both the spying activities of Mußgay's "N-Referat" ("Nesper department") in the "Kronprinzstraße" and the radio games of counter-intelligence would have to be ventilated. Both required secrecy. At a time when the end of the war was looming and the government had become increasingly unpopular, reports on the circumstances of the deaths of the ten individuals would be more likely to become public in the event of court proceedings, and so generate public unrest. That was worth avoiding. It was not till January 1945 that the families of the executed/murdered individuals received written notifications that their family members had been sentenced and executed for "preparing to commit high treason". On the express instructions of the RHSA, their place of execution was given not as Dachau but as their home city (in most cases) of Stuttgart.

The only member of the "Schlotterbeck group" who was executed only after undergoing a formal trial process was Theodor Seitz, the husband of Emmy Seitz. Theodor Seitz was a serving soldier at the time of the arrests. Just over two months after his wife's execution, on 2 February 1945, he was sentenced to death by a National Court Martial on account of his "not having reported war treason" ("Nichtanzeigen eines Kriegsverrats"). He was killed on the guillotine at the Torgau Military Prison four days later.

After the war was over, one former Gestapo officer volunteered the insight that most of those executed in November 1944 as members of the "Schlotterbeck group" had little involvement in anti-government resistance, and had simply been included because their names appeared on Eugen Nesper's contacts list. The truth of the matter is likely to remain unfathomed. Two people who were by definition members were the brothers Hermann and Friedrich Schlotterbeck, however. At the time when ten supposed group members - including the brothers' parents, sister and, in the case of Friedrich, fiancée - were executed, both brothers were still at liberty. Friedrich Schlotterbeck had successfully crossed to Switzerland, where he remained till after the war. Hermann Schlotterbeck had failed to cross, and had made his way back to Stuttgart where he remained in hiding till September 1944. His presence was then betrayed to the authorities and on 16 September he was arrested and, following initial interrogation, transferred by Gestapo officer Hagenlocher to the "Police prison" (as the badly overcrowded detention camp was commonly termed with increasingly savage irony) at Welzheim. The Schlotterbeck name was acquiring a certain level of unwelcome fame at this time, and the deputy camp governor was instructed to register prisoner Hermann Schlotterbeck under a false name and hold him in solitary confinement. That was done. During April 1945, however, as the approach of American troops heralded the end of the war, the "Police prison" was evacuated, on an instruction received from Himmler: surviving inmates were to be transported on trucks towards the Austrian Alps. During July 1945, a few weeks after the end of the war, three bodies were found in a hastily dug grave in a small forest just outside Riedlingen. They belonged to three Welzheim evacuees who had been shot on orders received from the Gestapo main office in Stuttgart. One of those had been Hermann Schlotterbeck..

=== Final years ===
Relatively little is known of Eugen Nesper's final years. When the war ended he was still in Switzerland. He had been arrested in Basel on 3 April 1945 and detained, suspected of "unauthorized espionage activity". Further investigation had to be abandoned, however, and on 22 June 1945 the Swiss authorities returned him to Germany. On 5 February 1947 he was again arrested in Basel and found to have crossed the border from Germany illegally. On this occasion he had a consignment of ball-bearings with him, which he had been intending to smuggle into Switzerland. On 10 February 1947 he was banned in perpetuity from returning to Switzerland: deportation was completed on 17 February 2021.

On 14 July 1948 the Stuttgart Denazification Court ("Spruchkammer") identified Nesper as a "major culprit" on account of his "involvement with National Socialism", and sentenced him to a ten-year term of internment. Two years later, on 19 July 1950 the Assizes Court at Konstanz added three more years of imprisonment on convicting him of the murder of Karl Weber, the border official whom he had shot - and evidently killed - during his escape from Germany in 1945.

== Reflections ==
Nesper clearly deserves a major share of the responsibility for the executions during 1944 and 1945 of eleven individuals identified in his records as members/associates of the "Schlotterbeck group". Nevertheless, the way in which the case was viewed and treated in the immediate post-war period invites a number of questions which were apparently overlooked at the time. In the deliberations the Denazification Court dealing with Nesper's case, those murders were central to the case. Yet in the cases of the former Gestapo officials who ordered and implemented those killings were treated as peripheral, and excluded from serious consideration in evaluating either culpability or atonement measures imposed. There was never any requirement for a judicial evaluation of the RHSA decision (and insistence) that ten of the eleven Schlotterbeck group verdicts and sentences should be determined and implemented outside any judicial process.

Another question which has intrigued commentators, and which arises naturally in the case of anyone identified as a "double agent", concerns Eugen Nesper's true loyalties and their political underpinnings. Eugen Nesper appears in sources as an exceptionally ambivalent figure. As a young man he was a committed communist, and when he fell into the hand of Soviet handlers they and their British counterparts were sufficiently persuaded of his anti-Hitlerite credentials to send him on an important mission on enemy territory. Yet in 1935 he was persuaded - admittedly through a "hard to refuse" offer - to agree to work covertly for National Socialist security services, and the people he betrayed in ways that led to their being killed were all associated with Communist anti-Nazi resistance. One conclusion put forward is that Eugen Nesper were through life driven by an exceptionally strong need for a father figure. The need for an authority figure - whether it was the police chief Friedrich Mußgay or a powerfully charismatic communist - was far more important to him than some fixed political conviction, and the result in terms of his activism was a constant tension between political extremes, between which his beliefs swung. The tensions probably remained unresolved throughout his life. That, certainly, was the verdict of Schaffhausen Cantonal President Walter Bringolf who was much involved in the Nesper case during and after the latter's time in Switzerland as a refugee from Nazi justice during the mid-1940s. It is also reflected in the version of Nesper featured in a 1948 synopsis for a film about his career in espionage. The film was never made, although "Je dunkler die Nacht, desto heller die Sterne", the long-forgotten semi-novel by Clara Nehmitz (in which Nesper is renamed "Noller") and on which the film would have been based, implies similar conclusions.
