= List of German Communist Party members =

A list of notable politicians and members of the German Communist Party (DKP):

== A ==
- Hans-Henning Adler (now Die Linke)
- Kersten Artus (now Die Linke)

== B ==
- Eva Bulling-Schröter (born 1956, politician, today 'Die Linke' (party))

== C ==
- Emil Carlebach

== D ==
- Franz Josef Degenhardt (1931–2011)
- Christian v. Ditfurth (until 1983)

== E ==
- Gisela Elsner

== F ==
- Franz Heitgres

== G ==
- Peter Gingold

== H ==
- Alfred Haag
- Lina Haag
- Hannes Heer
- Hans Heinz Holz
- Jörg Huffschmid

== K ==
- Gisela Kessler
- Franz Xaver Kroetz (until 1980)
- Maria Krüger

== M ==
- Herbert Mies

== N ==
- Harry Naujoks
- Otto Niebergall

== P ==
- Detlev Peukert

== R ==
- Max Reimann
- Paula Rueß

== S ==
- Sabine Wils
- Karl Schabrod
- Paul Schäfer (politician)
- Karl-Eduard von Schnitzler
- Karin Struck

== T ==
- Uwe Timm (until 1981)
- Axel Troost (now Die Linke)

== W ==
- Hannes Wader (until 1991)
- Christel Wegner
