= Gertrud Lutz =

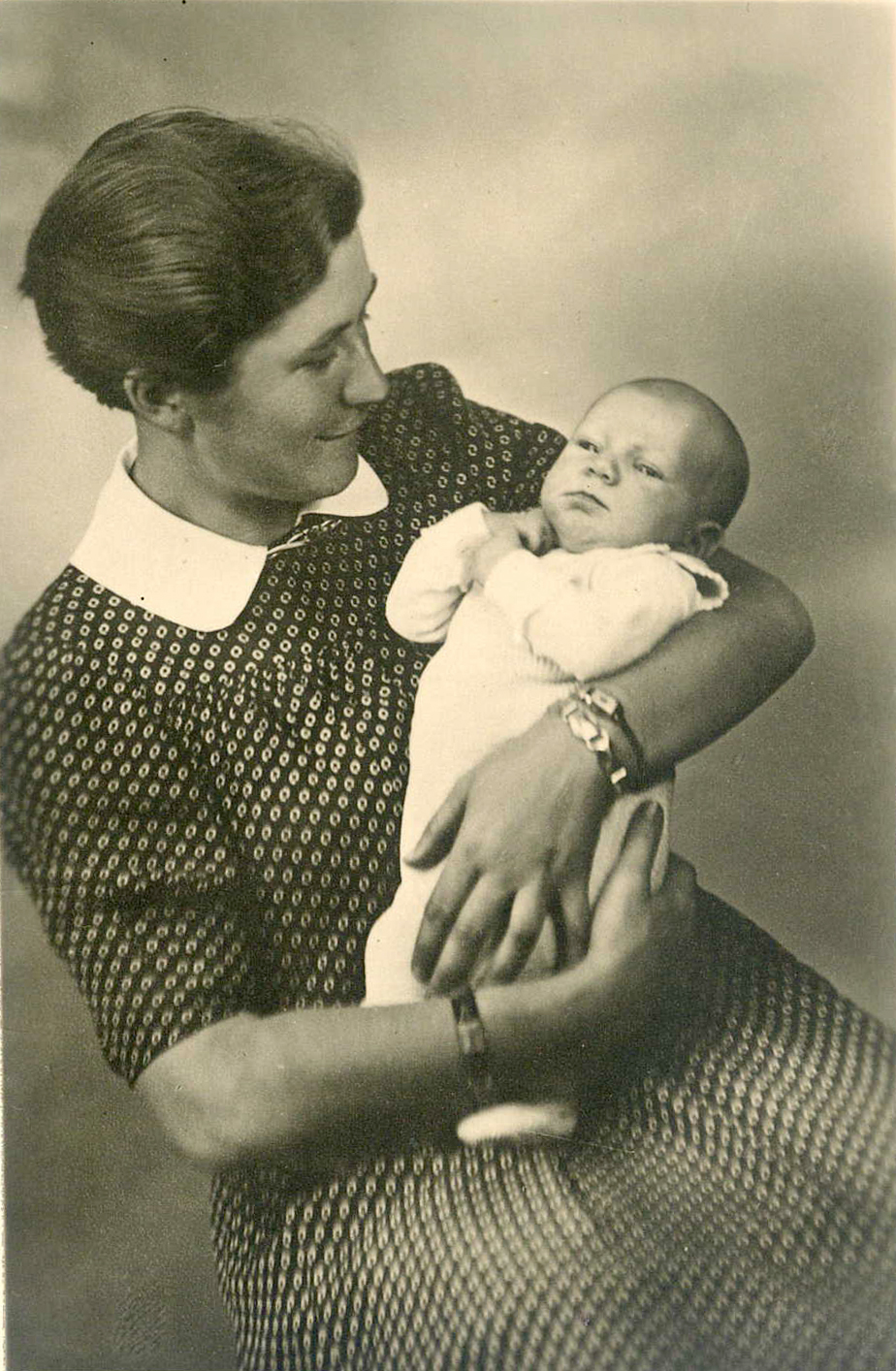
Gertrud and Wilfriede Lutz (1942)

Gertrud Lutz (born Gertrud Schlotterbeck: 17 September 1910 – 30 November 1944) was a German resistance activist. She died by shooting at the Dachau concentration camp.

== Life ==
Gertrud "Trude" Schlotterbeck was born in Reutlingen, a mid-sized town between Stuttgart and Ulm. Gotthilf Schlotterbeck, her father, worked as a metal worker at the Daimler Benz plant in Untertürkheim and an active trades unionist. Gertrud and her brother Frieder grew up in a politicised household. She became a member of the Young Communists and in 1931 joined the Communist Party itself. During this time she was working as a clerk at a Stuttgart publishing firm that produced communist printed matter.

The early 1930s were a period of intensifying political polarisation, and in 1932 Gertrud Schlotterbeck was arrested for the first time. She was held in investigatory custody on suspicion of communist subversion ("kommunistische Zersetzung"). However, on 4 February 1933 proceedings against her were dropped following the "Schleicher amnesty ("Straffreiheitsgesetz") (Note: Gesetz über Straffreiheit vom 20.12.1932, RGBl. 1932 I, S. 559)) of 20 December 1932. By the time of her release there had been a change of regime. In January 1933 continuing parliamentary deadlock had given the National Socialists the opportunity to take power: the new government lost no time in transforming Germany into a one-party dictatorship. During the first part of 1933 Gertrud Schlotterbeck escaped from Stuttgart and fled to the Luginsland quarter of Stuttgart to work "underground" (ie without her place of residence being registered at a townhall). Work in this context included political activity on behalf of the (now illegal) Communist Party. On 24 October 1933 she was again arrested on suspicion of "distributing communist subversive literature" ("Verbreitung kommunistischer Zersetzungsschriften"). On 2 September 1934 she was sentenced to 28 month detention on the usual charge of "preparing high treason" ("Vorbereitung zum Hochverrat"). She was now held at the Gotteszell women's concentration camp, a reassigned Dominican Monastery just outside Schwäbisch Gmünd, till 21 April 1936. At that point instead of being released she was transferred directly into "protective detention" at the Moringen concentration camp.

After her release, on 7 September 1936, Gertrud Schlotterbeck returned to living with her parents, now at Luginsland. During 1938 she married Walter Lutz, a forestry inspector, and relocated to Stuttgart-Degerloch. She worked till March 1939 as a typist. Though at liberty, Gertrud Lutz (as she had become) now lived her life under close official surveillance. War returned in September 1939 and she was arrested "as a precautionary measure", but released quite soon. Then at the start of 1942 Walter Lutz (who had been born in 1906) was conscripted into the army and sent off to fight on the Russian Front. The couple's daughter, Wilfriede Sonnhilde Lutz, was born on 2 August 1942. Naming a child "Wilfriede" at the height of a war being waged for glory of the Fatherland was a conscious piece of defiance by the child's mother: "Frieden" is the German word for "Peace". Walter Lutz never saw his daughter. He was killed in the fighting in Russia on 2 October 1942.

By this time Gertrud Lutz was not the only member of her family with extensive experience, from the inside, of Nazi concentration camps. Her brother Friedrich was released from the Concentration Camp at Welzheim on 28 August 1943 after which the entire Schlotterbeck family, at this stage in their Luginsland home, operated covertly as the "Schlotterbeck resistance group". In January 1944 Gertrud moved to the nearby village of Grabenstetten, where she moved in with the Keller family. Her intention was to try and protect her child from the increasingly destructive allied air-raids. In May 1944 Friedrich Schlotterbeck discovered that the "Schlotterbeck resistance group" had been betrayed to the Gestapo by a man called Eugen Nesper: No-one, according to at least one source, had fully trusted Nesper, but nor did it occur to anyone, till after it was too late, that he might be a Gestapo agent.

By various routes Friedrich Schlotterbeck now tried to organise an escape across the border into Switzerland for himself, their brother Hermann, Friedrich's finacee Else Himmelheber. Gertrud, believing she was safe, stayed behind with her baby at the Keller family home. Of the Schlotterbecks attempting the escape to Switzerland, only Friedrich succeeded in not being captured on the German side of the border. Soon afterwards, on 10 June 1944, Gertrud Lutz was arrested, along with her parents and her daughter: the authorities had reacted to Friedrich Schlotterbeck's escape by deciding to arrest his entire family.

The only family member who would still be alive at the end of the war was the baby. The authorities sent Wilfriede to a children's home run by the National Socialist People's Welfare [organisation] ("Nationalsozialistische Volkswohlfahrt") in nearby Waiblingen. Fairly early on she understood that her mother was not coming back. In the children's home she received a visit from Klärle Keller, the daughter of the family with whom she had stayed with her mother in Grabenstetten. It seems more than likely that the visit was undertaken at the request of Gertrud Lutz, still at this stage alive, but held in state detention. During the visit one of the care assistants at the children's home urged Klärle to "take the child [away] with her". In the children's home she would, likely as not, die of starvation or thirst. Wilfriede remained with the Kellers till after the end of the war. In 1946 Uncle Friedrich returned from Switzerland and collected her. When, in 1948, Friedrich moved to Dresden in the Soviet Zone Wilfriede went with him: she grew up calling him "Dad".

Following their arrest Gertrud Lutz and her parents underwent several months of torture and interrogation before, on 27 November 1944 they were taken from Stuttgart to the Dachau concentration camp and, on 30 November 1944, shot dead. A number of the Schlotterbecks' friends and neighbours were also rounded up at the same time, even though most had nothing at all to do with the family's resistance activism, and subjected to the same treatment before being taken to Dachau and shot at the same time as Gertrud Lutz and her parents. One family member who avoided being captured at this time was Gertrid's brother, Hermann Schlotterbeck. He was found and arrested only in October 1944 at which point he was taken to the Concentration Camp at Welzheim where he spent several months. As French forces advanced into Germany from the west the Germans retreated and the concentration camp was evacuated. The inmates were taken up into the hills where on 19 April 1945, a couple of weeks before the end of the war, Hermann Schlotterbeck was shot dead by an SS/Gestapo man called Albert Rentschler in a wood outside Riedlingen.
