= Schlotterbeck =

Schlotterbeck is a German language habitational surname. Notable people with the name include:

- Andreas Schlotterbeck (1982), German water polo player
- Anna Schlotterbeck, one of the married names of Anna Leibbrand (1902–1972), German political activist and writer
- Friedrich Schlotterbeck (1909–1979), German author
- Keven Schlotterbeck (1997), German professional footballer
- Nico Schlotterbeck (1999), German professional footballer
- Niels Schlotterbeck (1967), German former professional footballer
