= Liselotte Herrmann =

German Communist resistance fighter (1909–1938)

Liselotte "Lilo" Herrmann
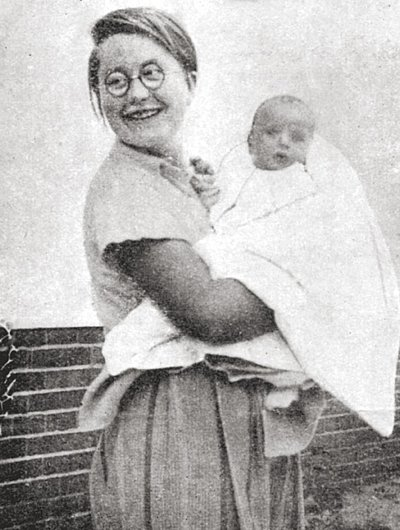
- Lilo Herrmann with her son, Walter in 1935
- Born: Liselotte Herrmann; 23 June 1909; Berlin, Germany
- Died: 23 June 1938 (aged 29); Plötzensee Prison, Berlin, Nazi Germany
- Occupation: Stenographer
- Children: Walter Herrmann

Liselotte Herrmann (called "Lilo", 23 June 1909 – 20 June 1938, executed) was a German Communist resistance fighter in Nazi Germany. Herrmann was the first woman to be sentenced to death by a Nazi court and then executed in Plötzensee Prison in 1938.

== Life ==
Born in Berlin, Liselotte Herrmann had a middle class liberal upbringing. Her father, Richard Hermann was an engineer who had to move several times for his job. In 1929 she completing her Abitur exams. Her essay was on Friedrich Hebbel's tragedy, "Herodes and Mariamne". After high school she initially planned to become a painter due the influence of Käthe Kollwitz but her father was against it and persuaded her to become a chemist instead. So she went to work as a laboratory assistant in a chemical factory to prepare her studies in chemistry. Later that year, her family moved to Stuttgart, where she attended the Technical College to study chemistry. As a schoolgirl, she was influenced by socialist ideas in Frankfurt and eventually joined the Socialist Schoolchildren's League (SSB) and the Young Communist League of Germany in 1928, and also became a member of the Red Students’ League (Roter Studentenbund). On 7 September 1930, she was fined 30 Reichsmarks for distributing "communist leaflets" in Esslingen during International Youth Camp, after refusing to hand them to the police. She then joined the Revolutionary Union Opposition (Revolutionäre Gewerkschafts Opposition) in 1931, and in the same year became a member of the Communist Party of Germany (KPD) in Stuttgart.

When I am asked about the goal of communism as I know it. I can express it in one sentence, and that is: the greatest happiness of the greatest number. If I am further asked how I have imagined the way to this goal, I answer: By convincing the masses and creating a majority for communism.

— Liselotte Herrmann, 1936

In 1931, she moved to Berlin to study biology at the Humboldt University in Berlin. In Berlin, she became actively involved in volunteering with the KPD and began her political education by attending classes at the Marxist Workers' School.

=== Resistance ===
Soon after the Nazis won the election in 1933, the KPD was outlawed after the Reichstag Fire Decree and formally banned on 6 March 1933. Nazi terror against all those of dissented increased abruptly. In an attempt to resist the Nazis, she together with 111 other students signed the "Call for the Defence of Democratic Rights and Freedoms" declaration. She was reprimanded and for political reasons expelled by the university for being an anti-fascist on 11 July 1933. From that point forwards, she was excluded from all German universities. From then on, she worked illegally against Germany's Nazi government and socialized with the armed resistance within the KPD organisation. When the KPD was banned, Herrmann hid the KPD official Fritz Rau (resistance fighter), eventually having a relationship by him. She temporarily took a job as a nanny and on 15 May 1934, her son Walter was born. The boys father remained a mystery, as Herrmann refused to reveal his identity. It was assumed her friend Walter Ehlen was the father or possibly Fritz Rau, who died in the same month, while in Gestapo custody in Moabit prison. or Württemberg KPD district leader Stefan Lovász (sources vary)

In September of the same year, she moved back to Stuttgart to be with her family and found work as a stenotypist at her father's engineering office. Upon arrival and with the help of a friend she established contact with the Stuttgart KPD district leader Stefan Lovász. Herrmann worked together with Diethelm Scheer for the KPD's intelligence unit, which collected evidence of Nazi Germany's illegal German re-armament programme. She maintained this connection via Josef Steidle, but her closest collaborator was Adolf Butz, an assistant at the Institute of Geography at Stuttgart Technical University, who maintained a wide range of Nazi opponents.

From late 1934, she worked as a technical aide to Stefan Lovász, until his arrest in June 1935. Working with a boat builder and KPD official Josef Steidle and the locksmith Artur Görlitz, she obtained information about re-armament, concerning secret weapons projects – munitions production at the Dornier aircraft factory in Friedrichshafen and the building of an underground ammunition factory (Muna) near Celle, via Eugen Beck, who was employed by the Stehle company in Stuttgart. The documents were relayed to the KPD's office in exile that had been set up in Switzerland.

=== Arrest, trial, and death ===
On 7 December 1935, Hermann was arrested in her family's apartment. During the search, the Gestapo found a copy of the plan for the ammunition plant hidden behind a mirror, along with KPD and Marxist literature. For three months, she was interrogated at the Stuttgart police prison, and from February 1936 she was held for 19 harrowing months in remand custody, whilst her young son had to be cared for by his grandparents. Charged in the People's Court (Volksgerichtshof), Herrmann and Stefan Lovász, together with KPD officials Josef Steidle and Arthur Göritz, were sentenced to death by the Second Senate in Stuttgart on 12 June 1937 for "treason in concomitance with preparation of high treason in aggravating circumstances". Herrmann's fellow party member, Lina Haag, was held in the prison cell opposite her. Haag wrote a letter of her experiences, which was turned into a memoir in 1947 in Eine Handvoll Staub (A handful of dust)

Deported to Berlin, after another year in the Barnimstrasse women's prison, she was transferred to Plötzensee Prison for execution. Despite international protests from many countries and an American petition containing 830,000 signatures and a petition for clemency submitted in 1937 by her family, Hermann was executed by guillotine on 20 June 1938. Lovász, Steidle and Göritz were also put to death the same day. The bodies of the five people were not buried, instead were given to anatomy professor Hermann Stieve of Charité Anatomical Institute for medical research.

== Memorials ==
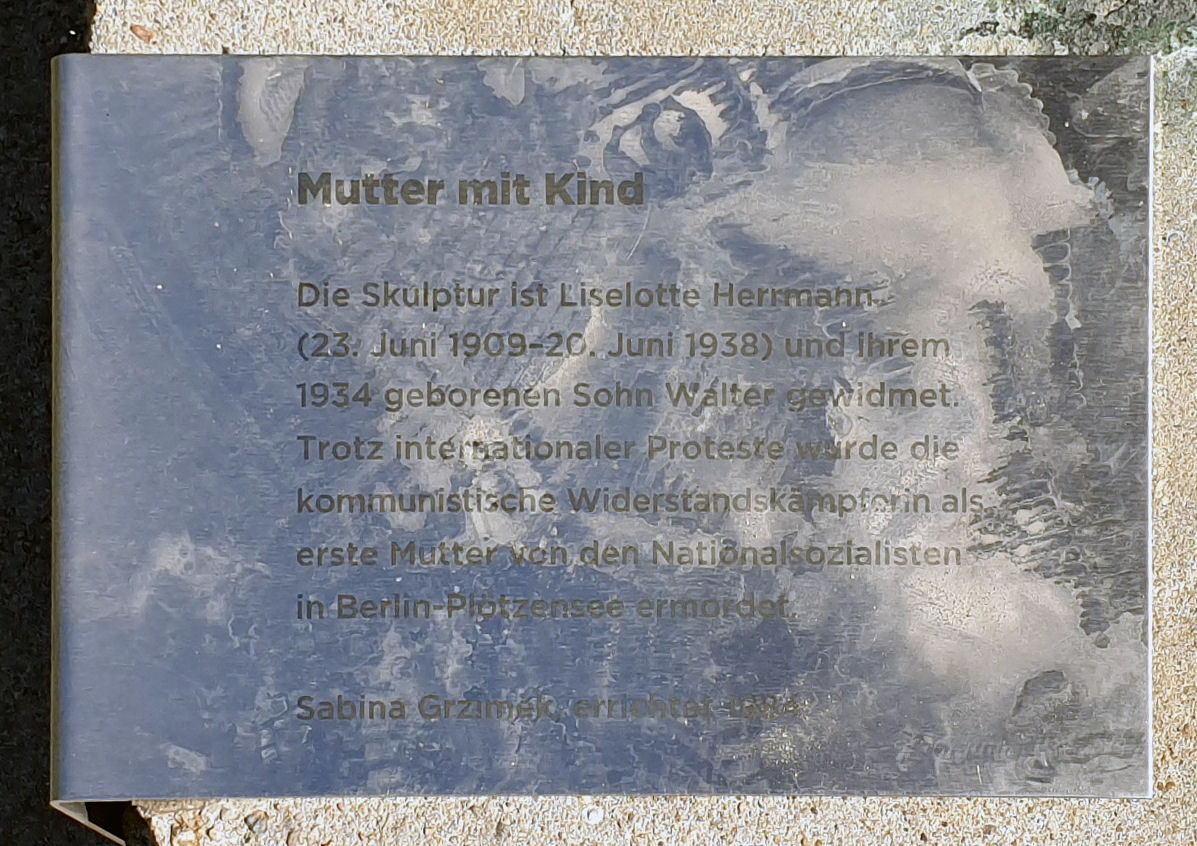
Memorial plaque for Liselotte Herrmann in Freiaplatz, Lichtenberg

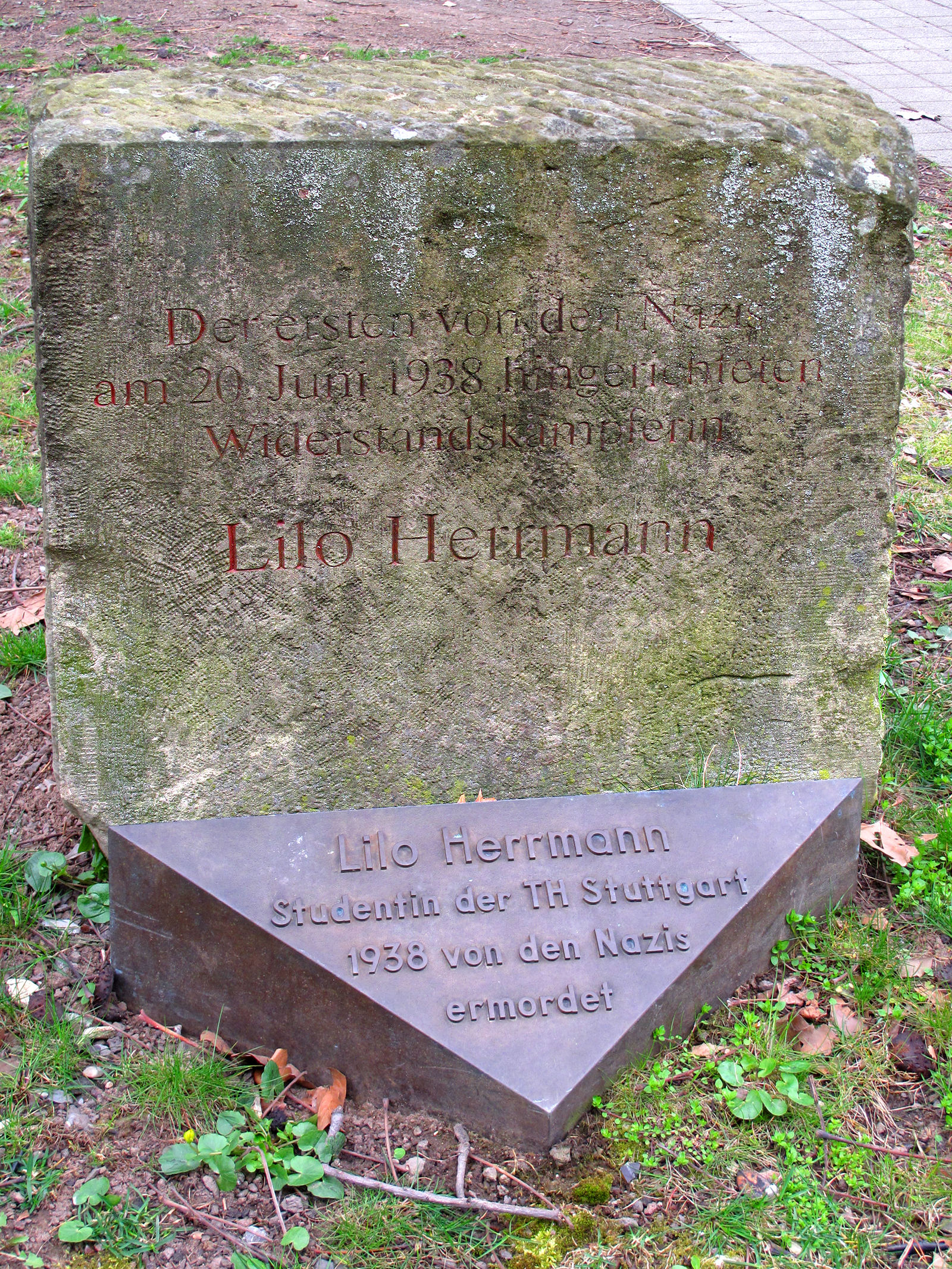
Memorial stone created in 1988 by Herbert Göser

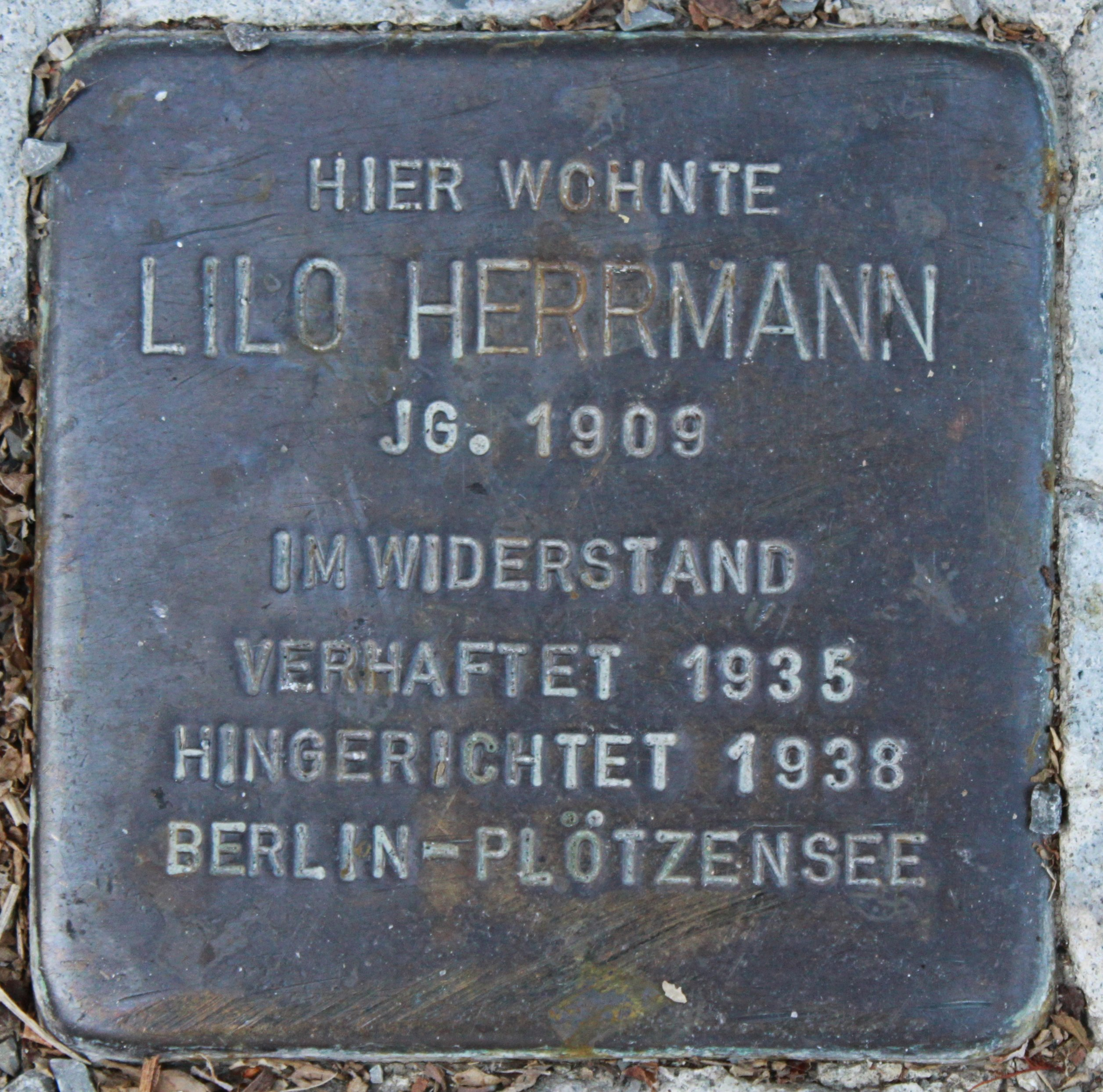
Stolperstein placed in 2008

In East Germany, many schools, streets, and institutions were named after her, including in Berlin, Neubrandenburg, Erfurt, Gera, Jena, Weimar and Chemnitz. These have been joined by new street names in the West, for example in Kiel, Schwäbisch Hall and Vaihingen an der Enz. In Leipzig, a small park in the east of the city is named after her. In Frankfurt (Oder), there is a "Lilo Herrmann" daycare center in the western part of the city. However, after German reunification in 1990, many were given new names to erase all references to Communism.

Indeed, even in Stuttgart, where Herrmann studied, she has been a controversial figure. In the 1970s, students at the university tried to get a new residence named after her, but the university administration refused. In 1987, the debate began again when the Stadtjugendring Stuttgart and the Association of Persecutees of the Nazi Regime – Federation of Antifascists made a proposal for a memorial plaque was discussed in a meeting at the Stuttgart municipal council and forwarded to the university. A commission was formed to examine the proposal who recommended that "the memory of Lilo Herrmann be maintained and promoted, but to refrain from building a monument only intended for it". On 20 June 1988, unknown persons from the Stadtjugendring Stuttgart placed a simple memorial stone to her on public ground close to the University of Stuttgart campus, which caused a stir. "Lilo-Herrmann-Weg" was the city's tribute to her, but it is little more than a 100 m-long blind alley affording access to public and private parking. In 2008, a Stolperstein was created and placed close to the residence of Lilos' former parents address in Stuttgart.

== See also ==
- Hilde Coppi
- Oda Schottmüller
