= Friedrich Mußgay =

German regional administrator

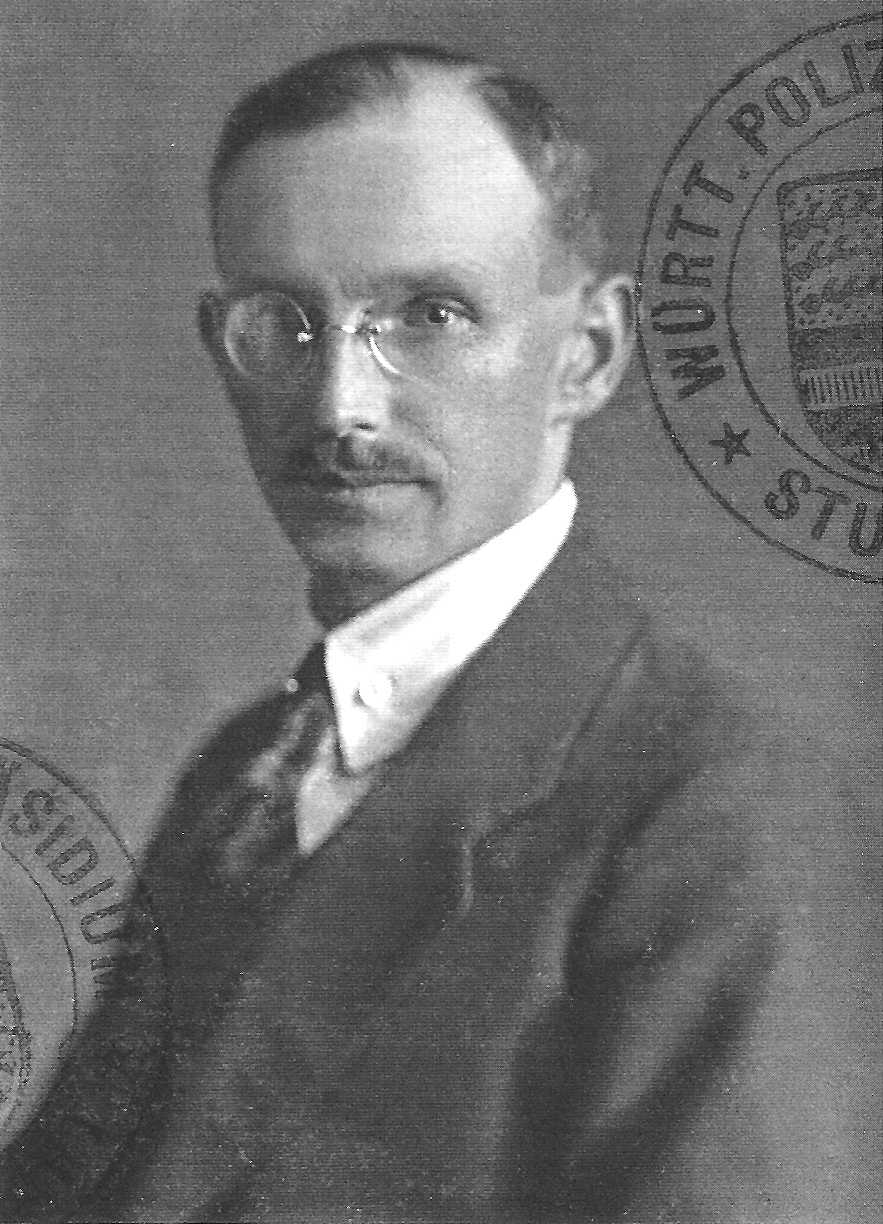
- Mußgay around 1940
- Born: Paul Emil Friedrich Mußgay; 3 January 1892; Ludwigsburg, Württemberg, German Empire
- Died: 3 September 1946 (aged 54); Stuttgart Prison, Württemberg-Baden, Allied-occupied Germany
- Cause of death: Suicide by hanging
- Occupations: Police chief SS-Obersturmbannführer
- Political party: NSDAP (1933–1945)
- Spouse: Emma Schaubacher (1892–1950)
- Children: Fritz (1918–?); Manfred (1927–1982)
- Parents: Georg Friedrich Mußgay (1847–1919) (father); Karoline Bay (mother)

Friedrich Mußgay (3 January 1892 – 3 September 1946) was an ambitious regional administrator who found his way into the police service. Between 1917 and 1933 he achieved rapid promotion. After 1933, through a combination of ability, ambition, and a certain amount of good luck, he benefitted from a succession of reconfigurations of homeland security to occupy a series of senior positions, serving as a "Kriminalrat" (Senior Officer of the Criminal Police department) from 1935, Officer in Charge of the Stuttgart State Police Headquarters complex from 1939 and an Obersturmbannführer from 1943. Through most of his police career, which lasted from 1917 until 1945, he was based in Stuttgart which was home city, but after the return of war in 1939 there were also postings abroad, notably, in 1938, to occupied Czechoslovakia. During the 1940s he was implicated in a range of Holocaust actions, but his suicide in 1946 ensured that the nature and extent of his involvement could never be properly presented and assessed before a court.

Commentators and, subsequently, historians have found Mußgay's character and contribution hard to pin down. According to the historian Friedemann Rincke, some saw his as a Rumpelstiltskin figure, while for others he was simply a "quiet professional". Among senior police officers, he was unusual in having left it until the last possible moment to join "the party", becoming a member only three months after the Hitler government took power. Nevertheless, as far as the new régime was concerned, there could be no doubt that he performed his duties efficiently and effectively, according to Sarah Stewart, another commentator-historian.

== Life ==
=== Provenance and early years ===
Paul Friedrich Mußgay was born into humble circumstances at Ludwigsburg, a prosperous mid-sized town set in the hills north of Stuttgart. Georg Friedrich Mußgay (1847–1919), his father, was employed as a caretaker. His paternal grandfather, like his father before him, had been a rural butcher. His mother, born Karoline Bay, also came from a family of countryfolk. Mußgay was born a Protestant, though records indicate that he resigned his church membership on 22 August 1941.

After attending lower and middle schools (which was compulsory) he moved on to attend senior school. After that he undertook military service for a year during 1913 as a "one-year volunteer", before progressing to an administrative traineeship for a career in regional government service. The traineeship lasted for five years, between 1913 and 1917, but it did not pass uninterrupted. It started with work as a local government administrative assistant, posted successively to Esslingen, Ellwangen and Mergentheim between July 1913 and April 1914. He also attended courses at the Administration College (" Verwaltungsfachschule") at which he made the acquaintance of his near contemporary Robert Scholl, who by a savage twist of irony became father to Hans and Sophie Scholl, known to historians of the period as high-profile resistance activists during the later Hitler years. This would not be the last time Mußgay and Scholl came across each other.

War broke out in July 1914. Between August 1914 and December 1918 Mußgay served in the army. He concluded his army career as a First Lieutenant in the army reserve, having won the Iron Cross — both 2nd Class and 1st Class, along with various other lesser marks of commendation.

=== Police service ===
Although it appears probably that the focus of his activity continued to focus on his military service until the war ended, in May 1917 Mußgay's five-year stint as an administrative trainee came to an end: he was appointed a member of the police service, to be based at police headquarters in Stuttgart. His activities during the turbulent immediate aftermath of the war are unknown, but on 26 August 1920 he was appointed to a position in the police service as "Verwaltungssekretär" (administrative secretary) with retrospective effect, the appointment being formally backdated to April 1920. Just a year later he was promoted to the position of "police commissar".

During 1923 a number of responsibilities and duties that had traditionally been undertaken by the Regional Police Service were reassigned, becoming the direct responsibility of the Stuttgart police service. A parallel development at the city's main police station was the establishment of a Political Police department. Both these changes were helpful in the progression of Mußgay's career, and a succession of promotions followed. In the Autumn/Fall of 1923 he became a "Kriminaloberinspektor" (loosely, "senior criminal officer"). Almost at once he involved himself in the activities of the Political Police department. By 1925 he was heading up two sub-departments within it: "Department N" ("Police Intelligence Service") and "Department V" ("Meetings and Associations"). The focus of his work now was to confront "enemies of the constitution". For Mußgay this became an almost personal crusade against the political left. Colleagues took to identifying him as the "Kommunistenjäger" ("communist catcher").

=== Régime change ===
The early 1930s were characterised by intensifying polarisation which spilled over onto the streets and led, in Germany, to parliamentary deadlock followed, in January 1933, by régime change and a rapid switch from democracy to one-party dictatorship. In this age of political renewal, Mußgay's reputation within and beyond the police service as a "communist catcher" was a career bonus. There is no indication that he had, up to this point, involved himself directly in party politics. On 1 April 1933, however, his membership came through of the "Schutzstaffel" (SS), (Note: SS membership number 69,594) the paramilitary wing of the now dominant National Socialist Party (NSDAP). Exactly a month after that he became a member of the NSDAP itself. (Note: NSDAP membership number 3,227,757) That same month he made the switch to the "Württemberg Political Police" department in the newly reconstituted Regional Police Service (still based in the centre of Stuttgart, albeit in a different building).

Further promotions followed. He continued to head up the Police Intelligence department under the new organisational structure, though events over the next decade suggest that the responsibilities in question were not always clearly delineated. The criminal side of his growing palette of responsibilities received a boost in November 1935 when he was appointed to the post of "Kriminalrat". In 1937 he became head of the Gestapo Executive Department II. It is thought that the focus of his duties remained, as before, surveillance of government opponents, supervision and administering the gathering of reports along with involvement in the interrogation of those arrested, employing the conventional tactics of threats and other coercive measures.

Another round of organisational restructuring was undertaken after 1935, bringing policing in Württemberg into closer alignment with government thinking. Police officers involved in security service operations were taken into the SS, within which they were assigned to the "SD" (security service). Accordingly, Mußgay's name appears on the SS rankings list for 1938. He is classified as an "SS-Hauptsturmführer", assigned to the Stuttgart main office of the "SD" section.

=== Sudetenland ===
During the first half of the nineteenth century nationalist elements in Germany took to calling the border region of what became Czechoslovakia as the Sudetenland. The entire region was ethnically diverse before the ethnic cleansing of 1945, and though sources differ over precise ethnic mix in the affected territories, it was widely accepted that in terms of language and self-defined ethnicity, the population of the Sudetenland was predominantly German. Between March 1938 and March 1939 the German government used this as a justification for the progressive annexation not just of the Sudetenland, but of virtually the whole of what had been Czechoslovakia. Although German-speakers from the regions might welcome the development, most Czechoslovaks did not. The occupation of Czechoslovakia was costly both to the occupiers and to the occupied in human terms and in terms of other resources. Friedrich Mußgay was one of those sent to Brünn (as the city was known to German speakers before 1945) to help, probably during 1938. Between March 1939 and July 1939, still based in Brünn, he was a divisional chief with the Gestapo in the region. Sources are imprecise on his activities in Czechoslovakia, but it appears that during the latter part of 1938 Mußgay was involved in setting up the Gestapo organisation in Brünn, presumably as part of a larger "Einsatzkommando" ("Gestapo task force"), and probably in some sort of a leadership role. In December 1939 he received a medal for his contributions. Between 1939 and 1941 Mußgay was probably serving at least for part of the time, as a senior Gestapo officer, helping to establish an effective presence for the German security services in occupied western Poland and eastern France. No further details are available.

=== Stuttgart police chief ===
Till 2 May 1940 SS-Sturmbannführer Dr Rudolf Erwin Lange (1910–1945) served as Deputy Chief of Police for Stuttgart. He was then permanently seconded to Berlin. Friedrich Mußgay, by then aged 48, took over his responsibilities. Under peace time circumstances Mußgay might have been considered a little old for such a promotion, but he was evidently regarded as politically reliable and competent. Colleagues half a generation younger who might, under more normal circumstances, have been promoted ahead of him were already away from home, having volunteered for army service. At this time the Stuttgart police chief was SS-Sturmbannführer Dr.Joachim Boës (1899–1941). Boës was drafted into the army in June 1941 and died in Bucharest just over a month later. Mußgay took over as Gestapo chief, and in effect chief of police for Stuttgart and the region administered from it. He resigned his church membership at the same time. He was confirmed in office in January 1942, and remained in post as Stuttgart's chief of police until 20 April 1945, just before the war ended. With Mußgay in charge the organisational structure of Stuttgart's policing and security administration quickly came to reflect closely the principles of the "Reichssicherheitshauptamt" (loosely, "National Security Main Office"), which under the direction of Heinrich Himmler had come to supplant the existing structures since its formation in 1939.

=== Executions of forced labourers ===
There were plenty of people who spotted the inhuman core of National Socialism even before 1933, but the brutalisation of Germany was greatly intensified after the outbreak war and, more particularly, after 1942, as the realisation dawned that the war might be lost. The demands of the military and the slaughter of war meant that the country faced an acute labour shortage. In order to keep essential factories and services running, large numbers of "workers" were imported from countries which had been over-run and placed under some form German military administration. In the Stuttgart region most of these "forced labourers" had been captured in occupied western Poland. These foreign workers were required to interact with state authorities and German society under special so-called "Polenerlassen" (loosely, "rules for Polish people"), which placed them outside the normal protections of the German legal code and required them to respect certain life-style constraints. For instance, sexual relations with German people were forbidden. Violators were threatened with the death penalty, administered under the euphemistic cloak of "special measures". It was no empty threat. Well publicised executions by hanging took place, as a deterrent to others. The mobile gallows used had been constructed for the purpose in the carpentry workshop at the Welzheim Detention Camp. Other security service chiefs at Mußgay's level of seniority tended to delegate the supervision of executions to other, but Mußgay like to attend these executions himself. On the occasions when he was unable to attend he was represented by his deputy, Hans-Joachim Engelbrecht, who was under clear instructions to report back with details of how the executions had been carried out.

=== Persecution and deportations of Jewish people ===
1941 was the year in which the Holocaust took hold across Germany and, progressively, the various occupied territories. On 10 June 1941 issued a public pronouncement giving notification of the "undoubtedly approaching final solution of the Jewish Question" (Note: "... zweifellos kommende Endlösung der Judenfrage".) He then issued the order, on 18 November 1941, to approximately 1,000 Jews that they should report to Stuttgart's Killesberg Conference Centre Complex on 27 November 1941. On 1 December 1941 the assembled Jews were deported by train to what was known at the time as the Reichskommissariat Ostland. The object of the exercise was "Entjudung" (approximately, "Dejewification") as Mußgay insisted. In his 18 November notification to the local government district offices he tried to give the impression that the forthcoming deportations to the east should be seen as simple resettlement operations. He stressed that deportees must be encouraged to take "work tools" with them "because in the settlement zones for the construction of the ghettos there are absolutely no materials either for construction nor indeed, for subsistence". It was less than reassuring, but there was no mention of the mass-killings ahead. As matters turned out, when the deportees arrived in Reichskommissariat Ostland they were detained in Riga, where most of them were killed during the early part of the next year.

A second deportation from Stuttgart, involving 278 victims, was arranged by Mußgay just one month later, this time to Izbica (near Lublin). In order to preserve the "resettlement" fiction, Jews older than 65 were not included in either the first or the second deportation organised from Stuttgart. On 22 August 1942 Mußgay organised a third deportation from Stuttgart in which over 900 people identified as Jewish were transported to Theresienstadt. That appears to have been the last of Mußgay's mass-deportations. Nevertheless, 17 more were deported on 1 March, followed by 19 on 15 April 1943 and 23 during June 1943. The last of the transports to Theresienstadt took place as late as February 1945. It is believed that during Mußgay's tenure as Stuttgart's police chief more than 2,600 people were deported. Another source gives a more precise figure: 2,423. Most of these would be dead before the war ended. Most were murdered. But enough returned home after the nightmare ended to help ensure that the killings could not be forgotten.

During the final months of his police career Mußgay launched and oversaw a major search for Jewish people living in "mixed marriages" as defined by the infamous so-called Nuremberg Laws. (Mixed marriages had created, apparently informally, a handful of cases of so-called privileged Jews who still had not been deported because their spouses were not Jewish.) He issued a decree on 25 January 1945 purporting to send any surviving Jewish citizens to the camp at Bietigheim, which is variously described as a transit camp or as a labor camp, and which after the Stuttgart State Police Headquarters complex was partially destroyed in an American air-raid during September 1944 had become home to several administrative departments of the unexpectedly decentralised Stuttgart police service.

=== The Schlotterbeck group ===
The smashing of the "Schlotterbeck" resistance group in September 1944 brought Mußgay's police career full circle. Gotthilf and Maria Schlotterbeck, along with their sons and wider family, were committed Communists who had hitherto managed to survive in Hitler's Germany. Because Friedrich Schlotterbeck managed to escape to Switzerland even after the group was destroyed, their story has been told. Nine of them were nevertheless captured and, on 30 November 1944, executed at the Dachau concentration camp on the basis of a determination (in the absence of any sort of trial) that they had been "preparing to commit high treason". A tenth group member, Hermann Schlotterbeck, was captured after failing to cross the heavily guarded Swiss frontier, and detained at the Welzheim "Police prison" (as the badly overcrowded detention camp was commonly termed, with increasingly savage irony). During April 1945 the "Police prison" was evacuated, on an instruction received from Himmler: surviving inmates were to be transported on trucks towards the Austrian Alps. In July 1945, a few weeks after the end of the war, three bodies were found in a hastily dug grave in a small forest just outside Riedlingen, where they had been placed by the Stuttgart SS-men who are believed to have recognised and shot them on orders received from the Gestapo main office in Stuttgart. One of the bodies had belonged to Hermann Schlotterbeck.

=== "Götterdämmerung" ===
By September 1944, with large American armies advancing towards Germany from the west and large Soviet armies advancing from the east, it was generally accepted that, in the absence of an unforeseen miracle, Germany had lost another World War. It was evident that mere military victory would not be good enough for the Americans. Those deemed responsible for Germany's war crimes and persecutions were to be held to account. Back in April 1944 the Americans drafted a "Handbook for Military Government in Germany" which became generally available at the end of August 1944. The introduction quoted from a memorandum drafted by President Roosevelt himself. It was not encouraging for members of the conquered nation, least of all for top level Gestapo officers. (Note: “Too many people here and in England hold the view that the German people as a whole are not responsible for what has taken place – that only a few Nazis are responsible. That unfortunately is not based on fact. The German people must have it driven home to them that the whole nation has been engaged in a lawless conspiracy against the decencies of modern civilization.”) The Soviet government was less explicit, but reports accompanying growing numbers of civilian refugees streaming towards the west were not encouraging. Gestapo officers reacted in a range of different ways. Mußgay was among those who believed that the Americans would quickly come to the realisation that their real enemy was not Germany, which was already as good as defeated, but the Soviet Union, which remained a constant threat to the rest of Europe and to the wider world. Until the Americans came round to that point of view, his loyalty to his fatherland would not be dimmed. On 30 September 1944 Friedrich Mußgay's name was added to the list of potential war criminals being prepared under US policy directive proposals.

During April 1945 the already partially destroyed Stuttgart State Police Headquarters was closed down and abandoned by former officers and officials. Some fled south, hoping to escape across into Switzerland. Mußgay was one of approximately 160 in south-western Germany who had responded to a plan by Heinrich Himmler to create a series of "Werwolf" organisations, mandated to carry out acts of sabotage behind enemy lines and take steps to ensure that none of the German population collaborated with the (in this part of Germany mainly American) allied invaders. The "Werwolf" organisation in Württemberg operated under the code name "Elsa". As the Americans arrived there is very little indication that the "Elsa" group committed significant acts of sabotage, or that they were conspicuously active in dissuading the defeated civilian population from "collaborating". They were nevertheless well prepared, at least in the Stuttgart region. Starting in January 1945, work had started at the Police Headquarters on producing false identity documents which were of high quality, and which to the eyes of military administrators from the west, would generally appear indistinguishable from genuine identity documents. Then in April 1945 "Elsa" members raided the cash in the police station, so in the immediate term they were evidently adequately funded. Despite the absence of high-profile acts of sabotage, they turned out to be surprisingly effective in hindering the Americans, who came to believe that there were far more of them than there actually were, and therefore overestimated the threat and progressed with appropriate hesitancy. Little is known of "Elsa"'s actual activities. Most of what the Americans found out came from a single source, a spy working as a message carrier for the organisation who was also providing regular reports to the US military administration. Nevertheless, "Elsa" members were not always easy to find. The group was split into 22 separate cells each of 5 or 6 people, and cell members generally had no knowledge of other cells. Each cell contained at least one woman because, as underground movements had long known, women were able to act more inconspicuously than men. A woman carrying a bag of (as onlookers might assume) food was unlikely to be stopped for questioning. After six months, by January 1946, surviving records nevertheless indicate that the American army believed they had rounded up "all the leading figures" in the organisation. Mußgay' had presumably been closely involved in setting up the "Elsa" network during the closing months of the war. However, he was arrested in April or May 1945.

=== Death ===
On 20 April 1945, in the wake of the closure of the city police station and the murder of prisoners held there, Friedrich Mußgay and his wife fled from Stuttgart and headed south along the Neckar valley towards the Swabian Jura. He was subsequently captured at the end of April or in early May 1945, and taken to the newly adapted American military jail in Stuttgart. A year and a half later he hanged himself in his cell. As one source puts it, Friedrich Mußgay thereby spared himself the verdicts of earthly judges.

== Evaluation ==
Jürgen Schuhladen-Krämer, in a biographical contribution, describes Mußgay as a "Bürokrat im Bewährungsaufstieg" (loosely, "a bureaucrat permanently on probation"). On the one hand, as a boss he would protect his subordinates whenever he could. In his disputes with church authorities he was frequently seen to be visibly discomforted. On the other hand, he did not always restrict his roles to those of the deskbound bureaucrat. During prisoner interrogations he could behave like the archetypal "little man" fortified with the temperament of a frontline Gestapo interrogator, "a shrieking frothing man trying to make victims compliant with threats, reminiscent of cartoon Nazi policemen familiar to later generations from subsequently produced movies". Perhaps he was just a simple Württemberg political policeman promoted too far too fast. Did he, perhaps, just see himself as a "people's police officer", tempered by frontline wartime experiences, who had become convinced that it was his duty to preserve his hard-won class privileges and social status on the homefront against those whom he identified as Germany's enemies?
