= Else Himmelheber =

German activist (1905–1944)

Else Himmelheber

Else Himmelheber (30 January 1905 – 30 November 1944) was a German resistance activist during the Nazi years. She was executed (shot) at the Dachau concentration camp on 30 November 1944.

== Life ==
She came from a working-class family. She was born in Ostheim, an inner city quarter on the eastern side of Stuttgart. In 1911 the family of six moved into a two-room apartment at Adlerstr. 24 in Heslach, another inner city quarter of Stuttgart. Left wing politics were a feature of Heslach: in the 1912 general election 74% of the votes cast were for the Social Democratic Party, although the outbreak of war in 1914 diverted the focus of the political left away from domestic issues. Else's father, Philipp Himmelheber, was conscripted into the army: although he survived the fighting he suffered a lung wound from the effects of which he died during the march home. His widow was left to support her four children by working as a seamstress.

Else Himmelheber spent seven years at the local school and then took an office job. When war ended, in 1918, she was aged 13: she joined local communist youth organisations, playing a leading role in the Stuttgart branch of the Young Spartacus League. Sources identify a stubborn streak as a result of which she refused to be confirmed as a member of the church on reaching the age at reach, conventionally in this region of Germany, confirmation took place. In the end she submitted to the combined pressure from the local priest and her mother and agreed to the confirmation. However, in the listing of 64 young people confirmed into the church at that time, her inclusion as one of those confirmed represents both her first and her last appearance in the local church records. Meanwhile, at work, despite the basic level of her schooling, she became an accountant-book-keeper.

From 1921 she was a member of the Young Friends of Nature ("Naturfreundejugend Deutschlands"). In or before 1924 she was a member of the Young Communists and in 1926, the year of her twenty-first birthday, she joined the Communist Party (KPD). She had already, the previous year, delivered a lecture on women's work to the national party conference. In 1928 and/or 1931 she relocated to Berlin. Around this time she was also a member of a delegation sent by the newly established League of Friends of the Soviet Union on an extended visit to Moscow where she took a job working as a saleswoman in a German-language book distributor.

After returning to Berlin she took a paid position with the party leadership. Tasks included writing articles for party newspapers. She was the main speaker at the "Rhine and Ruhr" Women's Struggle congress ("Kampfkongress der Frauen") held at Düsseldorf in the Autumn/Fall of 1931. A year later, in September 1932, she quit her paid position with the party leadership and registered herself as unemployed.

The political backdrop was transformed in January 1933 when the Nazi Party took power in Germany and lost no time in transforming the country into a one-party dictatorship. The Reichstag fire at the end of February 1933 was instantly blamed on "communists" and marked the start of a mass round up of communist politicians and activists who had been at large when German was a democracy. Early in 1933 Himmelheber began to work "underground" for the Communist Party, working with Karl Fischer on reorganising the party's regional structure in Kassel to accommodate its now illegal status. On 20 November 1933 she was arrested, and on 29 June 1934 she was sentenced by the district high court in Kassel to two and a half years in prison, after which she was transferred to the Moringen concentration camp which since October 1933 had been designated the sole official concentration camp for women.

Heinrich Himmler was a Nazi with an exceptionally wide palette of senior government jobs including many normally associated with an Interior Minister or Home Secretary. Once each year he visited the women's concentration camp and amnestied a few of the inmates. His criteria were mostly unclear, but those released under these circumstances were always blonde. Naturally blonde, in 1938 Else Himmelheber was one of the lucky ones. On her release she promptly had her hair dyed black, however, in order to signal rejection of the Nazi race-based policies. She now returned to live with her parents back in Stuttgart.

In 1943 she renewed her friendship with Friedrich Schlotterbeck, a party comrade from their time together in the Young Communists. Schlotterbeck was released from "protective custody" in the Welzheim Concentration Camp at the end of August 1943 following a period of detention totalling a few months short of ten years. Their relationship developed and by the early summer of 1944 Himmelheber and Schlotterbeck were engaged to be married.

In the meantime, in January 1944 they were unexpectedly contacted by another comrade from the past, Eugen Nesper. Nesper had been fighting in the German army since 1944, but had been captured by the Soviets. He had then been trained up by the Soviet intelligence services, handed over to the British intelligence services for further training, and parachuted back into Germany. During the first part of 1944 a group of communist resistance operatives formed around Nesper that included initially Schlotterbeck and his younger brother Hermann along with Karl Stäbler and Else Himmelheber. What Himmelheber and Schlotterbeck did not know when they were rediscovered by Nesper in January 1944 was that a few days earlier Nesper had been discovered in possession of an illegal radio device. Faced with the choice between rapid transfer to a concentration camp and working for the Gestapo, Nesper had chosen the Gestapo, and it was at their direction that he had sought out the others, overcome their initial suspicions of him: together they had built up a cell of communist activists in their Stuttgart suburb. Nesper betrayed the resistance group to the Gestapo, and though precise details of who knew what when are unclear, it appears that at the end of May 1944, with Himmelheber and Schlotterbeck making final preparations for their wedding early the next month, Nesper told them that they were about to be arrested.

The four core group members hastily formed a plan to escape to Switzerland. The Gestapo had by now got hold of the group's radio and were using it to transmit false messages, so it was particularly important that at least one of them got out of Germany in order to inform the forces fighting Nazi Germany that their radio was now being used to transmit wrong information. In order to maximise the chance that at least one of them would get through, the four arranged to travel separately. Only one of them, Friedrich Schlotterbeck, got through. Else Himmelheber failed to get through the frontier on the train to Zürich and returned to Stuttgart where she was arrested a few days later and taken to the Gestapo main office where for several months she was interrogated and tortured.

Himmelheber told the Gestapo nothing about her links to the "Schlotterbeck circle". Meanwhile, others deemed "connected with the Schlotterbeck circle" were arrested. After some months Himmelheber was taken, together with Schlotterbeck's parents, his sister Gertrud Lutz, and several other friends and relations who had absolutely nothing to do with their resistance activities, to the Dachau concentration camp. Here they were shot dead on 30 November 1944 for preparing to commit high treason.

== Recognition ==
In 2005 a Stolperstein was placed in front of the apartment where she lived with her family at Adlerstr. 24 in Stuttgart-Heslach. In addition, the little street "Else-Himmelheber-Staffel" has been named after her since 1996.
