= Karl Schabrod =

Karl Schabrod (born 19 October 1900 in Perleberg; died 31 March 1981 in Düsseldorf) was a German communist politician.

== Life and work ==
After elementary school in Perleberg, Schabrod was from 1915 to 1918 an apprentice in his father's carpentry firm. In 1919 he visited the School of Applied Arts in Leipzig for several months and then worked until 1927 in various cities as a carpenter in his learned profession.

He was a member of the free trade union German Woodworkers Association (Deutschen Holzarbeiterverband) since 1920. From 1921 he was also a member of the monistic youth (Monistische Jugend) and an employee of the club magazine. Politically he belonged from 1922 initially to the SPD and joined in 1924 the KPD. For the youth organization of the party, he was active in the episode. In addition, he was a member from 1926 to 1929 of the Rotfrontkämpferbund and a Workers' Gymnastics and Sports Association. From 1927 to 1929 he was editorial apprentice Communist Bergische Volksstimme in Remscheid and sat there in the council. Because of political differences Schabrod had to leave the editing committee in 1929 and worked intermittently as a carpenter. From 1930 to 1931 he went to study to Moscow. After his return he worked as editor of the Communist newspaper Freiheit (freedom) in Düsseldorf.

After the beginning of Nazi rule, Schabrod was arrested at a leaflet campaign of Düsseldorf antifascists and was detained until 1934 in the concentration camp Börgermoor. After his release in May 1934, he went into hiding in the Ruhr Region, was arrested again in July 1934 and re-admitted to the Steinwache in Dortmund and mistreated physically. In December of the same year a treason trial against Schabrod took place. Although the prosecution had sought the death penalty, the sentence was life imprisonment. Until 1945, he was sitting in the penitentiaries Werl and Münster, before he was liberated by the Americans.

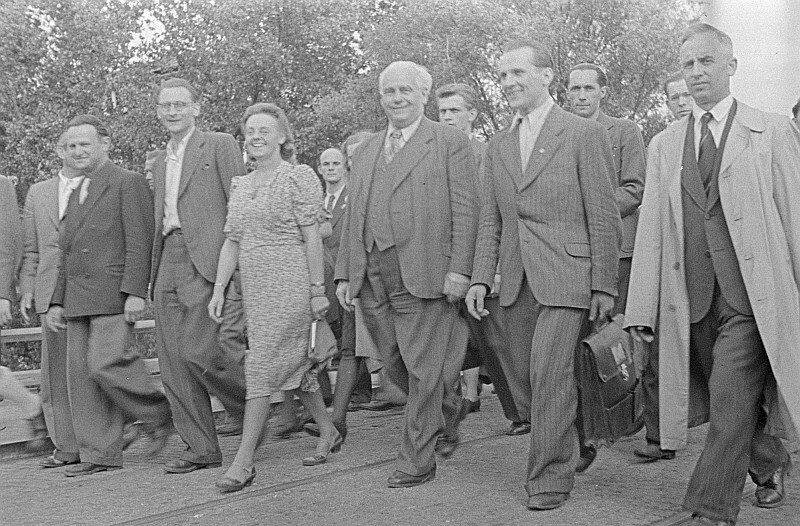
During the First Parliament of the FDJ in June 1946 (from left to right): Erich Glückauf, Paul Verner, Elly Winter, Wilhelm Pieck, Erich Honecker und Karl Schabrod.

Since 1945, Schabrod participated as leader in rebuilding the KPD in the Ruhr Region and was until 1946 a full-time party secretary in the district of Lower Rhine and South Westfalia. He was also a licensee of the newspaper Freiheit in Düsseldorf and temporarily editor. Furthermore he was involved in the Union of Persecutees of the Nazi Regime. He also served from 1950 to 1954 as member of the City Council in Düsseldorf and temporarily as Group Chairman of his party. Schabrod already belonged to the parliament of North Rhine-Westphalia from 1946. He belonged to the parliament until 1950. There he was from 1947 to 1950 Group Chairman of his party.

After the KPD ban from 1956 Schabrod worked for a short time as a carpenter, then he was at times an employee of the "Central Council for the protection of democratic rights" (Zentralrat zum Schutz demokratischer Rechte), and from 1958 to 1960 editor of the magazine Freie Meinung. In 1958 Schabrod candidated as an independent candidate for the state election in North Rhine-Westphalia, but was suspected to be covertly active for the banned KPD, and was subsequently sentenced to nine months probation. Also in the general election of 1961 he ran as an independent candidate. Because of conspiracy he was sentenced to more than two years in prison and was banned as a journalist. At the same time his status as a victims of the Nazi Regime was revoked. In 1965, the prohibition was lifted. Finally, in 1968 he became a member of the DKP and was a member of the Regional Board for North Rhine-Westphalia

Karl Schabrod is honorary citizen of Perleberg. His grave is at the Düsseldorf North Cemetery.

== Literature ==
- 60 Jahre Landtag Nordrhein-Westfalen. Das Land und seine Abgeordneten. Düsseldorf 2006, S. 547f.
- Bernd Haunfelder: Nordrhein-Westfalen. Land und Leute 1946–2006. Ein biographisches Handbuch. Aschendorff Verlag, Münster 2006, S. 399f.
- Schabrod, Karl. In: Hermann Weber, Andreas Herbst: Deutsche Kommunisten. Biographisches Handbuch 1918 bis 1945. 2., überarb. und stark erw. Auflage. Karl Dietz Verlag, Berlin 2008, ISBN 978-3-320-02130-6.
