= Anna Leibbrand =

German political activist and writer (1902–1972)

Anna Leibbrand Anna Schlotterbeck
- Born: Anna (Josephine) Wiedemann; 2 May 1902; Munich, Germany
- Died: 24 July 1972; Groß Glienicke, German Democratic Republic
- Occupations: Political activist, writer
- Political party: KPD; SED
- Spouse(s): Robert Leibbrand (1923); Hans von Fischer (1939); Friedrich Schlotterbeck (1951)

Anna Leibbrand (Note: She was married three times and accordingly may appear in sources under any one of the following four names: Anna Wiedemann, Anna Leibbrand, Anna von Fischer (Anna Josephine Fischer as the author of Hinter den sieben Bergen (1945)), Anna Schlotterbeck.) (2 May 1902 – 24 July 1972) was a left-wing German political activist and writer.

She left Germany in 1933 to escape the Nazi regime, but twenty years later, after returning to Germany, was arrested and for several years imprisoned, in the aftermath of the Noel Field espionage affair.

== Life ==
Anna Wiedemann was born in Munich where her father worked as a printer, and where she attended elementary school, after which she moved to a School of Mechanical Engineering in Esslingen, emerging in the third year of the war, 1917, with a qualification in Technical Drawing. She then took a job as a graphic artist and typist with Robert Bosch GmbH in Stuttgart-Feuerbach.

1918 was the year of her sixteenth birthday and it was the year when she joined the Socialist Young Workers Association and the Free Socialist Youth Organisation. It was also the year of German defeat in the First World War, which was followed by many months of national and regional revolution. She participated in the Spartacus League's battles in Stuttgart that took place between November 1918 and January 1919. In 1924 she became a member of the recently established German Communist Party, becoming a member of the party's youth wing leadership for the regional parties in Königsberg, Danzig, Halle and for Berlin itself.

In 1923 she had married Robert Leibbrand, a leading Party Official from Stuttgart. By 1927 they were living in Moscow where she worked for the Comintern as a typist till 1929. When the couple returned to Berlin in 1929 Anna Leibbrand became the party women's section head for the Berlin-Brandenburg district. She was also working as an editor on a party newspaper called "Die Arbeiterin" (literally "The [female] Worker"). Until 1933 she also sat on the district council.

In January 1933 the NSDAP (Nazi Party) took power and lost little time in switching to one- party government in Germany. All political parties (other than the Nazi Party) were now illegal, but the new Chancellor had, in opposition, been particularly vitriolic about the Communist Party. Anna and Robert Leibbrand nevertheless continued with their (now illegal) party work. On 24 March 1933 Robert Leibbrand was arrested: he would spend most of the twelve Nazi years in a succession of jails and concentration camps. Anna had not been with her husband when he was arrested and she continued with her own party work till July 1933. In September 1933, however, she emigrated to Switzerland where she took work as a domestic servant. She immediately joined the Swiss Communist Party, remaining a member of it and of its successor party till 1948. After a couple of years she obtained a job as a doctor's assistant. In 1938 Anna and Robert Leibbrand were divorced and in 1939 she married her employer, the doctor Hans von Fischer also, in the process, taking Swiss citizenship.

It was also during this time that, together with Hans von Fischer, she set up in Zürich the "Centrale Sanitaire Internationale", a left-wing medical charity initially intended to provide medical support to fighters in the Spanish Civil War. She also undertook illegal work for the Italian Communist Party at this time. Switzerland's neutral status during the Second World War enabled Anna von Fischer to work with left-leaning political and medical support organisations in various countries both during and directly after the war. War ended, formally in May 1945, but at the direction of the German senior Communist, Franz Dahlem, she remained in Switzerland for a further three years. Her contacts during the 1940s included Noel Field, a leading member of the Unitarian Universalist Service Committee, a disaster relief and refugee support organisation with close US links. In 1946 she warned the Party leadership in what would later be East Germany that Noel Field was an alleged agent of the US security services.

She finally returned to what remained of German in October 1948, settling in the Soviet occupation zone. The end of the war had appeared to signal an end to one- party dictatorship, but under Soviet administration the contentious merger of the KPD and more moderately left-wing SPD had already, in April 1946 prepared the ground for a return to one- party rule. Anna von Fischer joined the resulting Socialist Unity Party (SED / Sozialistische Einheitspartei Deutschlands) in 1949, which was also the year in which the zone became the Soviet sponsored German Democratic Republic, formally founded in October. After a period of unemployment, in 1949 she took a job as a correspondent with Tägliche Rundschau, a Dresden based newspaper produced for East Germany by the Red Army. She stayed with the newspaper till the start of August 1951. She was also working with the Soviet Press Bureau, and in 1950 found time, briefly, to attend a course of political study at the regional party academy. Meanwhile, she was by now living with another high-profile party member, the writer Friedrich Schlotterbeck, whom she married in March 1951.

In February 1951, following an intervention by the then highly active Regional Party Control Commission (Landesparteikontrollkommission) for Saxony, she was summarily expelled from the country's ruling SED (party) on "suspicion of espionage". They found themselves invited to demonstrate their loyalty to the state by outstanding work at the infamous uranium mines nearby. On 15 March 1953 Freidrich and Anna Schlotterbeck were both arrested without being told why, because of "criminal relationships with the American". The American in question was a double (or possibly triple) agent called Noel Field, a committed communist who seems to have been providing intelligence to various security agencies and whose revelations provide a rich if confusing backdrop to a number of show trials in East Germany and several surrounding states in the fevered cold war atmosphere of the early 1950s. In 1941 Anna von Fischer had indeed passed to Field numerous addresses of emigrants of various nationalities. During their time in Switzerland Freidrich Schlotterbeck and Anna von Fischer (as she had then been) were also on friendly terms with Herta Jurr-Tempi who may have been a Gestapo informer.

Following their arrest, Anna's daughter by her former marriage to Robert Leibbrand was placed in a children's home, while Anna Schlotterbeck was detained by the Ministry for State Security successively in Chemnitz, Berlin and Rostock. Slightly more than a year following her arrest it was in Rostock on 27 April 1954 that she had her moment in court, which resulted in a four-year prison sentence for "crimes under Article 6 of the East German constitution in connection with an offence against Control Council Directive 38".

Both Friedrich and Anna Schlotterbeck were released from prison early in 1956, however. Release was followed by the usual unpublicised rehabilitation and quiet readmission into the ruling SED (party). The punishment was deleted from the official record in 1957. Friedrich and Anna Schlotterbeck settled in Groß Glienicke near Potsdam, supporting themselves by writing books and radio plays. They wrote several radio plays together including Die Memoiren der Frau Viktoria (1962), and became close friends with fellow writers Gerhard and Christa Wolf. In 1968 Anna Schlotterbeck prepared a manuscript entitled "Hohenschönhausen, Zelle 51", which dealt with her experiences of state detention in East Germany, and which was published in the West in 1986, some fourteen years following her death in 1972. East German fellow-citizens would need to await German reunification in 1990 before being able to access a copy legally.
