= Franz Heitgres =

German politician (1906–1961)

Franz Heitgres (October 23, 1906 – November 12, 1961) was a German politician (KPD) and Senator in Hamburg.

== Life and work ==
Heitgres joined the Communist Party (KPD) in 1928 and was a member of the Wasserkante district leadership of the Communist Youth Association of Germany (KJVD). Additionally, he served as the chairperson of the Red Sports Movement Wasserkante and was responsible for publishing the newspaper 'Roter Nordsport.' In 1932, due to political differences with the KPD leadership, he was relieved of this responsibility and expelled from the party.

During the Nazi era, he was imprisoned for two years in the Neuengamme concentration camp due to his political convictions. In the Federal Republic of Germany, he served as the chairman of the Committee of Former Political Prisoners, the Hamburg state association of the Association of Persecutees of the Nazi Regime, until 1950.

As the head of the Office for Restitution and Refugee Assistance, he was a member of the Senate Petersen appointed by the British occupying forces from November 13, 1945, to November 15, 1946. In 1946, he was also a member of the appointed Hamburg Parliament. In 1954, due to criticism of the situation in the Soviet occupation zone, he was expelled from the KPD and joined the Social Democratic Party (SPD). The expulsion was justified citing 'systematic subversive activities and a hostile attitude towards the party leadership.
