= Hans-Henning Adler =

German politician (born 1949)

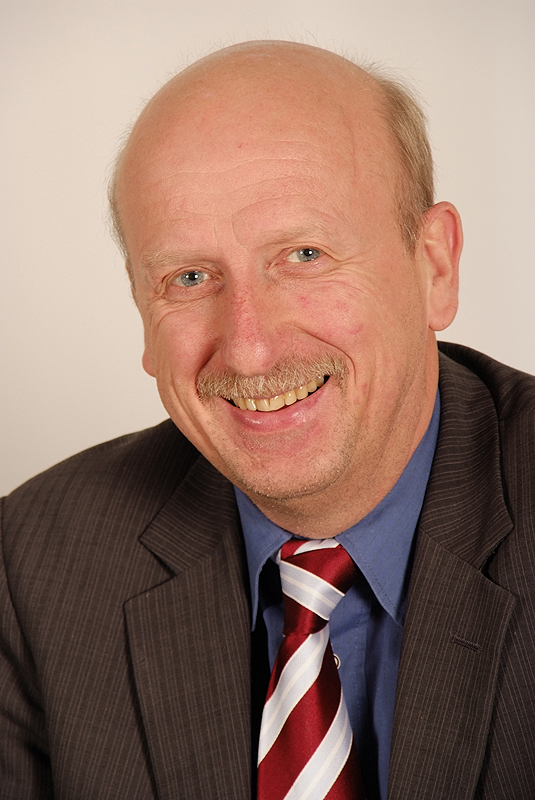
- Hans-Henning Adler 2009

Member of the Landtag of Lower Saxony
- In office 2008–2013

Personal details
- Born: 12 December 1949 (age 75); Göttingen, Germany
- Political party: Die Linke

Hans-Henning Adler (born 12 December 1949) is a German politician and member of The Left Party. From 2008 until 2013, he was a member of the Parliament of Lower Saxony, and since 2010 he has been a party leader of the Left.

== Life ==
Adler was born in Göttingen. In 1968, he completed his Abitur at Felix-Klein-Gymnasium in Göttingen. Subsequently, he studied at the University of Göttingen and the University of Bonn. While a student, he was a member of the founding committee of the University of Oldenburg, from 1970 until 1973. In 1974 and 1976, he passed the two phases of the German bar exam, and since then he has worked as a lawyer in Oldenburg; as such, he has represented people who come under certain legal restrictions as a result of their anti-government or radical politics. He is the author of numerous journal articles, as well as several books. He is married and has 3 children.

== Politics ==
During his study to become a lawyer (and until 1970), Adler was a member of the Socialist German Student Union (Sozialistische Deutsche Studentenbund) and the Spartacus Marxist Student Group (Marxistische Studentenbund Spartakus). Until he left the party in 1989, he belonged to the German Communist Party. In 1990 he became a founding member of the Party of Democratic Socialism (PDS) for Lower Saxony, becoming the long-running state chairperson. For several years, he was a member of the Rules Committee for the PDS, and since 1996, he has belonged to the City Council of Oldenburg, where he is head of the four-member bloc of the Left Party. From 26 February 2008 he served as a member of the Parliament of Lower Saxony, where he was the chairperson and legal spokesperson for his party. Additionally, he is a member of the Associate Committee of the Oldenburg-East Frisian Water Board (Oldenburgisch-Ostfriesischen Wasserverbandes), as well as a member of the Associate Committee of the Community Savings Bank (Sparkassenzweckverbandes).

After the 2013 Parliamentary elections in Lower Saxony, the Left Party did not reach the 5% threshold to garner any seats in the state parliament, and so as a result, Adler lost his seat.

== Works ==
- Adler, Hans-Henning (2007). Die Ehe mit ausländischem Partner : ein rechtlicher Ratgeber für Eheschließungen, ausländerrechtliche Probleme und Scheidungen [Marriage With a Foreign Partner : A Legal Guide for Marriages, Problems Under Immigration Law and Divorces] (in German). Zsr-Verlag. ISBN 978-3-940758-03-3.
