= Alfred Haag =

Alfred Haag (15 December 1904, Schwäbisch Gmünd, Württemberg – 8 August 1982) was a member of the Youth movement of the Communist Party of Germany (KPD) in the small Württemberg town of Schwäbisch Gmünd in the 1920s, he married another communist; Lina Haag in 1927. He was a volunteer editor for the Sueddeutsche Zeitung workers in Stuttgart, later he was elected a member of the regional parliament for the KPD until Hitler's rise to power in 1933. Both Alfred and Lina were soon arrested, and both spent many years in prisons and concentration camps.

Alfred was first in the Upper Kuhberg concentration camp near Ulm until it was dissolved in 1935, then at the Dachau concentration camp until 1939, when he was transferred to the Mauthausen concentration camp. Lina was released in 1939, and having been reunited with their daughter, she moved to Berlin and obtained work. She visited the HQ of the SS almost daily to petition for her husband's release until 1940, when she finally, and incredibly, obtained permission for an audience with Heinrich Himmler and he secured Alfred's release from Mauthausen. He had survived physical torture whilst detained there and at Dachau.

Alfred was soon afterwards drafted into the Army and sent to the Eastern Front, and Lina and their daughter were bombed out of their home in Berlin. Lina was transferred to work in a hospital in Garmisch. Whilst there she wrote a memoir of her experiences in the form of an extended letter to Alfred, not knowing if she would see him again. It was eventually published in 1947 as 'A Handful of Dust' or 'How Long the Night' in English.

Alfred was taken prisoner by the Red Army and eventually released in 1948, when they were reunited once again and lived together in Munich until Alfred's death in 1982. Alfred worked until his death as advocate for the victims of the camps in the Union of Persecutees of the Nazi Regime (VVN-BdA). For many years he was its Bavarian regional chairman. In 2007, Lina was given the Dachau Award for Courage. She lived in Munich until her death in 2012.
