= Lina Haag =

- Born: Lina Jäger; 18 January 1907; Hagkling, Kingdom of Württemberg, German Empire
- Died: 18 June 2012 (aged 105); Munich, Bavaria, Germany
- Occupations: anti-Nazi activist; author
- Known for: Dachau Award for Courage

Lina Haag née Jäger (18 January 1907 – 18 June 2012) was a German anti-Nazi activist and author.

== Early life ==
Haag was born in Hagkling in Baden-Wurttemberg, Germany. and was a member of the Youth movement of the Communist Party of Germany (KPD) in the small Württembergish town of Schwäbisch Gmünd in the 1920s. In 1927, she married fellow Communist Alfred Haag. Alfred was a member of the regional Parliament for the KPD until Adolf Hitler's rise to power in 1933.

== Prison time ==
Both Lina and her husband were arrested and spent many years in prisons and concentration camps. The Haag's were arrested in the large roundups after the Reichstag fire on 27 February 1933. Lina spent many years in Remand Prison, during which time she met other prominent prisoners such as Liselotte Herrmann. Lina was freed in 1938 after managing to turn her camp commandant at Lichtenburg against the Stuttgart Gestapo.

== Alfred's release ==
Once released, she was reunited with her daughter, moved to Berlin, and secured a job. She visited the headquarters of the SS almost daily to petition for her husband's release. In 1940, she obtained permission for an audience with Heinrich Himmler, who secured Alfred's release from the Mauthausen concentration camp. Alfred survived physical torture while detained there and also at Dachau concentration camp.

== Writing ==
Alfred was soon drafted into the Wehrmacht, and sent to the Eastern Front, and Lina and their daughter were bombed out of their home in Berlin. Lina was transferred to work in a hospital in Garmisch. While there, she wrote a memoir of her experiences in the form of an extended letter to Alfred, not knowing if she would ever see him again. The letter was eventually published in 1947 as A handful of dust. (Eine Handvoll Staub). Alfred was taken prisoner by the Red Army and eventually released in 1948.

== Honours ==
The Haags lived in Munich until Alfred's death in 1982. In 2007, Lina was given the Dachau Award for Courage.

== Death ==
On 18 June 2012, Haag died in Munich, aged 105.
