= Welzheim =

- Town
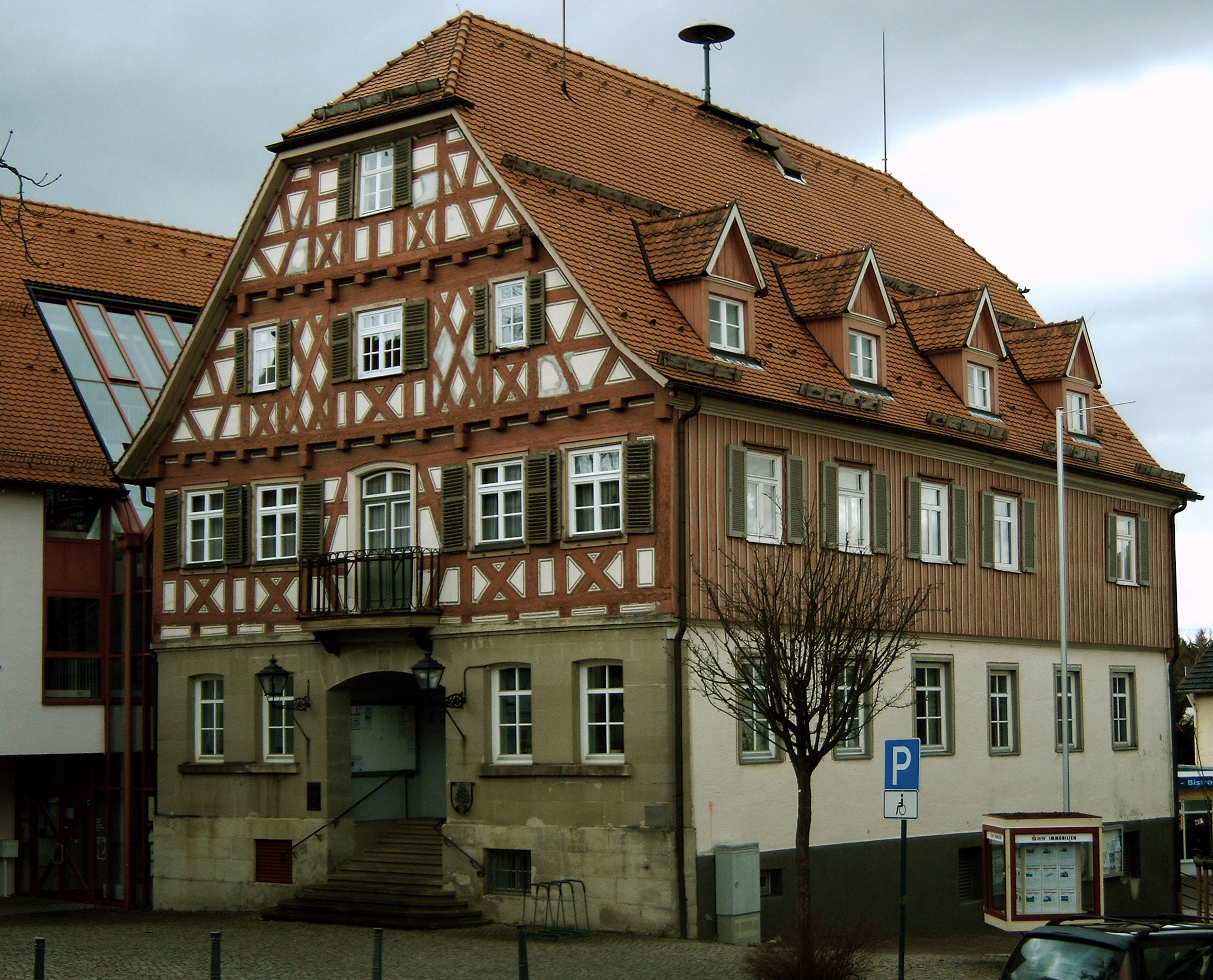
- Town hall of Welzheim

- Flag Coat of arms

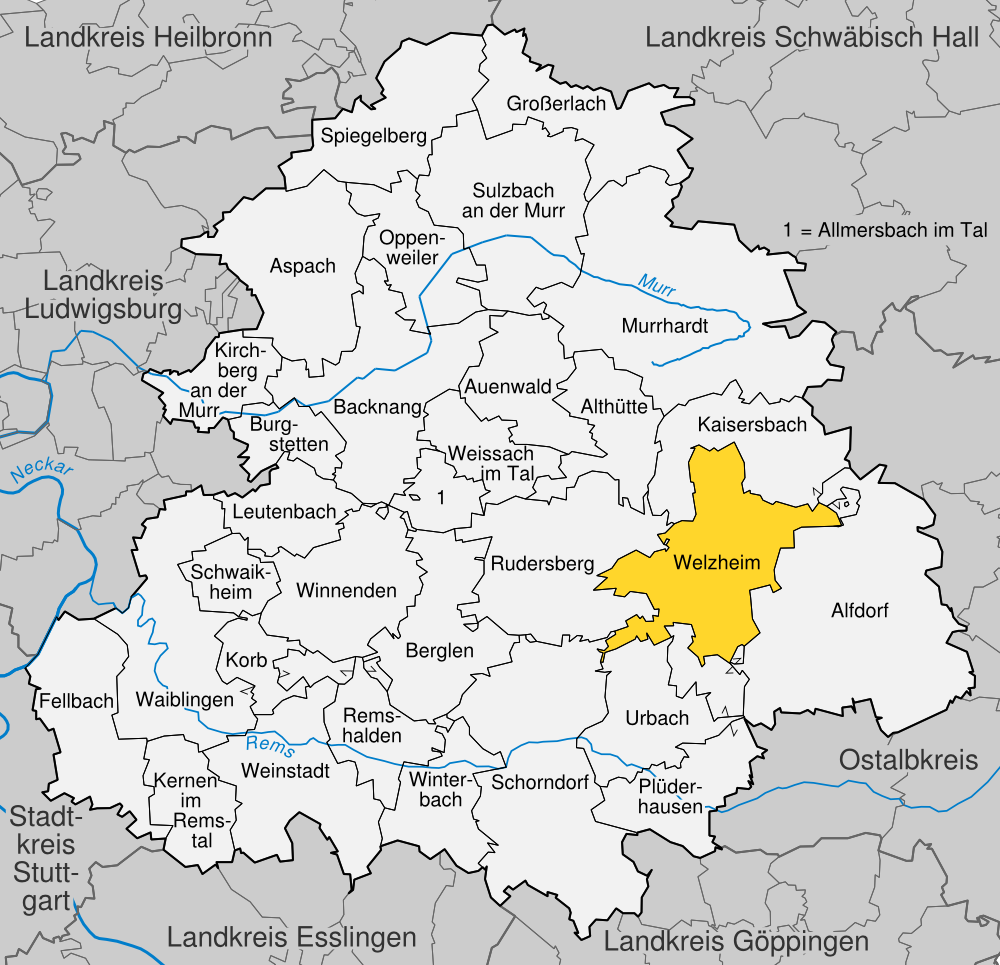
- Location of Welzheim within Rems-Murr-Kreis district
- Interactive map of Welzheim
- Location within Germany Location within Baden-Württemberg
- Coordinates: 48°52′29″N 09°38′04″E
- Country: Germany
- State: Baden-Württemberg
- Admin. region: Stuttgart
- District: Rems-Murr-Kreis

Government
  - Mayor (2026–34): Thomas Bernlöhr

Area
  - Total: 37.99 km^{2} (14.67 sq mi)
- Elevation: 503 m (1,650 ft)

Population (2025-12-31)
  - Total: 11,268
  - Density: 296.6/km^{2} (768.2/sq mi)
- Time zone: UTC+01:00 (CET)
  - Summer (DST): UTC+02:00 (CEST)
- Postal codes: 73642
- Dialling codes: 07182
- Vehicle registration: WN
- Website: www.welzheim.de

Welzheim (German pronunciation: [ˈvɛltsˌhaɪm]) is a town in the Rems-Murr district, in Baden-Württemberg, Germany. It is located 35 km east of Stuttgart and 15 km northwest of Schwäbisch Gmünd, in the Welzheimer Wald, part of the Swabian-Franconian Forest. Welzheim has been a state-recognised health resort (Luftkurort) since 1943.

The surrounding area is largely rural and forested, and forestry and timber have traditionally been important to the local economy.

== Sights ==
Natural attractions near Welzheim include the Ebnisee, a lake near neighbouring Kaisersbach, and the Mühlenwanderweg (mill hiking trail), a 37 km circular route through the Welzheimer Wald linking eleven historic mills, with five shorter signposted loops.

In the town, the Archäologischer Park Ostkastell occupies the site of the eastern Roman fort on the Upper Germanic Limes, part of a UNESCO World Heritage Site. Its west gate and part of the fort wall were reconstructed in 1980 after excavations in 1976–77, and the site was expanded into an archaeological park in 1993. Other sights include the Protestant St. Gallus Church, consecrated in 1499, with late-Gothic sandstone figures and stained-glass windows by Gottfried von Stockhausen, and the town hall.

== History ==
=== Roman period ===
Around 150 AD, after the Roman frontier was moved forward, Roman troops built two forts at Welzheim, the West and East forts, with a civilian settlement between them. The site was abandoned by the Romans in 260. Linguists have reconstructed the Latin name as (Castra) Valentia on the basis of the town's medieval name, Wallenzin.

=== Middle Ages to 20th century ===
Welzheim is first mentioned in 1181 as Wallenzin, when its church belonged to Lorch Abbey. A document from 1266, during Hohenstaufen rule, refers to a mayor and citizens of Welzheim, and the town dates its town rights to that year. Whether it actually held full town rights in the Middle Ages is uncertain, however: until it was formally granted town status in 1840, it was generally described as a village or market town. In 1335 the castle and settlement were sold to the Schenk von Limpurg family. The St. Gallus Church was consecrated in 1499.

After the Limpurg line died out in 1713, Welzheim passed to Württemberg. In 1718 Duke Eberhard Ludwig granted it to his mistress, Wilhelmine von Grävenitz. In 1726 a fire destroyed much of the town, including the church, which was rebuilt the following year; a new town hall followed in 1731. The duke took Welzheim back from Grävenitz in 1732.

From 1806 Welzheim was the seat of a Württemberg district (Oberamt), apart from 1810 to 1819, when the district administration was moved to Lorch. The district was dissolved in 1938 and Welzheim became part of the district of Waiblingen; since 1973 it has belonged to the Rems-Murr-Kreis. From 1824 until 1977 the town was also the seat of a Protestant deanery.

=== Nazi era ===
From 1935 to 1945 the Gestapo headquarters in Stuttgart ran a camp in Welzheim's former local court prison. Officially called the Polizeigefängnis Welzheim ("Welzheim police prison"), it was commonly known as KZ Welzheim. It served as a Gestapo prison for political and other prisoners, as a transit camp for prisoners being sent to concentration camps and for Jews before deportation, and, during the war, as a labour camp for foreign forced labourers. The International Tracing Service estimated that 10,000 to 15,000 men passed through it. The camp was evacuated in April 1945.

At least 65 death sentences were carried out by hanging or shooting, mostly in a quarry near the town. Prisoners included the resistance fighter Hermann Schlotterbeck, brother of Friedrich Schlotterbeck, who was shot by a Nazi execution squad near Riedlingen in April 1945. Memorials include the victims' graves in the cemetery on Rudersberger Straße and the former execution quarry; in 2020 the square in front of the former camp headquarters was renamed Hermann-Schlotterbeck-Platz.

== Religion ==
Besides the Protestant St. Gallus Church and the Catholic Christ the King Church (Christkönigskirche), Welzheim has congregations of the Süddeutsche Gemeinschaft, the Baptists, the Evangelical Methodist Church, the New Apostolic Church and the Evangelischer Brüderverein, as well as a mosque.

== Notable people ==
- Justinus Kerner, poet and physician, lived in Welzheim from 1812 to 1816.
