= Friedrich Schlotterbeck =

German politician (1909–1979)

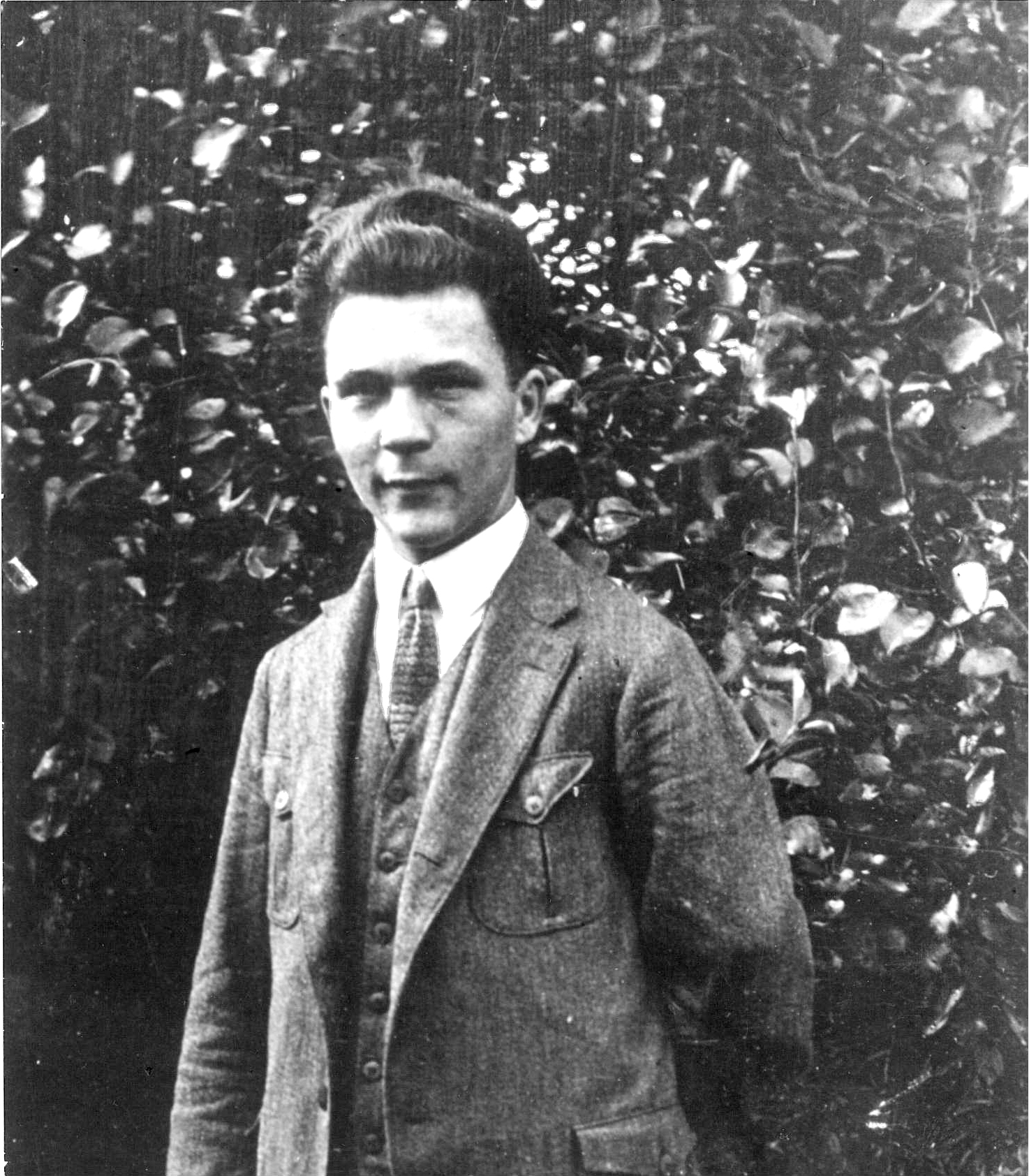
- Born: Albert Friedrich Schlotterback; 9 January 1909; Reutlingen, Kingdom of Württemberg
- Died: 7 April 1979; Buch, East Berlin, East Germany
- Occupation: Novelist
- Spouse: Anna Leibbrand/Schlotterbeck (1902–1972)
- Writing career
- Period: 1940s–70s
- Notable works: The Darker The Night, The Brighter The Stars

Albert Friedrich Schlotterbeck (January 9, 1909 – April 7, 1979) was a German author who wrote prose fiction, plays, and radio plays, and was a local leader of the German Resistance during World War II.

== Biography ==
Born in Reutlingen in the Kingdom of Württemberg as the son of a metal worker, he joined the KJD, the German Communist Youth Party, in 1923, and the Communist Party of Germany (KPD) in 1927. He studied in Moscow from 1929 to 1930, returned to organize groups against the Nazis, and was arrested by the Nazi government. He was held in various Nazi concentration camps from 1934 to 1943, when he was released from the Welzheim concentration camp. He continued his anti-Nazi activities with the Schlotterbeck Group, but the group was captured by the authorities and deported to Dachau, where all captured members were summarily executed, including Schlotterbeck's entire family (except for a three-year-old girl) and his fiance, Else Himmelheber, on November 30, 1944. Schlotterbeck managed to flee to Switzerland.

Friedrich's brother, Hermann Schlotterbeck, was denounced by an informer on September 16, 1944, after having been in hiding for weeks. Following months of imprisonment and torture in the Welzheim concentration camp (Gestapo prison), he was transported away by truck by the SS shortly before the end of the war during the evacuation of the camp. On April 21, 1945, he and two fellow prisoners, Johann Gottlieb Aberle from Dettenhausen and Andreas Stadler from Alsace, were shot in a forest near Vöhringerhof, close to Riedlingen, on the orders of Friedrich Mußgay, head of the officially dissolved Stuttgart State Police Headquarters, by SS and Gestapo officer Albert Rentschler. Only Karl Stäbler, who suffered a gunshot wound to the thigh during his failed escape attempt across the Swiss border, managed to return to Stuttgart. There, he was hidden by friends in a garden shed until the end of the war.

After 1945 he led the Union of Persecutees of the Nazi Regime (VVN), an association of victims of Nazi persecution, in US-occupied Württemberg-Baden. He moved to Dresden in 1948 and was active in low-level political functions, but was removed from the SED, the Socialist Unity Party of Germany, in 1951, and imprisoned from 1953 to 1956. Author of an autobiography, Je dunkler die Nacht, desto heller die Sterne: Erinnerungen eines deutschen Arbeiters 1933-1945 (1945), and Im Rosengarten von Sanssouci (1968). His autobiography was translated by Edward Fitzgerald as The Darker The Night, The Brighter The Stars: A German Worker Remembers (1933-1945) (London: Gollancz, 1947).
