= Le Déjeuner sur l'herbe (disambiguation) =

Le Déjeuner sur l'herbe (English: The Luncheon on the Grass) is an 1863 painting by Édouard Manet.

Le Déjeuner sur l'herbe or Luncheon on the Grass may also refer to:

- Le Déjeuner sur l'herbe (Monet, Paris), 1866 painting by Claude Monet
- Le Déjeuner sur l'herbe (Monet, Moscow), 1867 painting by Claude Monet
- The Luncheon on the Grass (film), 1979 musical film
- Déjeuner sur l'herbe, 2004 album by Les Breastfeeders
- Le déjeuner sur l'herbe: les trois femmes noires, 2010 painting by Mickalene Thomas
- Le Déjeuner sur l'Herbe, 1969 album by the New Jazz Orchestra

== See also ==
- Picnic on the Grass, 1959 comedy film
