= Gau Württemberg-Hohenzollern =

Administrative division of Nazi Germany

- Gau of Nazi Germany
- 1925–1945
- Flag Coat of arms

- Gau Württemberg-Hohenzollern on the left, north of Switzerland
- Capital: Stuttgart
- Government
- Gauleiter
  - 1925–1928: Eugen Munder
  - 1928–1945: Wilhelm Murr
- History
  - Established: 8 July 1925
  - Disestablished: 8 May 1945
Preceded by	Succeeded by
Free People's State of Württemberg; Province of Hohenzollern	Württemberg-Baden; Württemberg-Hohenzollern
- Today part of: Germany

The Gau Württemberg-Hohenzollern, formed on 8 July 1925, was an administrative division of Nazi Germany from 1933 to 1945 in the German state of Württemberg and the Prussian province of Hohenzollern. Before that, from 1925 to 1933, it was the regional subdivision of the Nazi Party in that area.

== History ==
The Nazi Gau (plural Gaue) system was originally established in a party conference on 22 May 1926, in order to improve administration of the party structure. From 1933 onward, after the Nazi seizure of power, the Gaue increasingly replaced the German states as administrative subdivisions in Germany.

At the head of each Gau stood a Gauleiter, a position which became increasingly more powerful, especially after the outbreak of the Second World War, with little interference from above. Local Gauleiters often held government positions as well as party ones and were in charge of, among other things, propaganda and surveillance and, from September 1944 onward, the Volkssturm and the defense of the Gau.

The position of Gauleiter in Württemberg-Hohenzollern was held by Eugen Munder from its founding to January 1928 and then by Wilhelm Murr from February 1928 to May 1945. Murr and his wife committed suicide after having been captured by the French Army shortly after the end of the war.

== See also ==
- Gauliga Württemberg, the highest association football league in the Gau from 1933 to 1945
