= Free People's State of Württemberg =

German state (1918–1945)

Free People's State of Württemberg Freier Volksstaat Württemberg
- State of the Weimar Republic and Nazi Germany
- 1918–1945
- Flag Coat of arms (1922)

- The Free People's State of Württemberg (red) within the Weimar Republic
- Capital: Stuttgart
- Area
  - 1925: 19,508 km^{2} (7,532 sq mi)
- Population
  - 1925: 2,580,235
- Government
  - Type: Republic
- President
  - 1918–1920 (first): Wilhelm Blos
  - 1933–1945 (last): Christian Mergenthaler
- Reichsstatthalter
  - 1933–1945: Wilhelm Murr
- Historical era: Interwar period
  - Established: 9 November 1918
  - Constitution enacted: 29 September 1919
  - Abolition (de facto): 7 April 1933
  - Abolition (de jure): 1945
Preceded by	Succeeded by
Kingdom of Württemberg	Württemberg-Baden; Württemberg-Hohenzollern
- Today part of: Germany

The Free People's State of Württemberg (German: Freier Volksstaat Württemberg) was a state of the Weimar Republic (1918–1933) and Nazi Germany (1933–1945). It was formed from the Kingdom of Württemberg during the German revolution of 1918–1919 which broke out in the final days of World War I and led to the fall of the German Empire and all of Germany's reigning monarchs, including King William II of Württemberg.

The Free People's State of Württemberg was a parliamentary republic that was more stable than the Weimar Republic of which it was a part. It was led initially by parties of the moderate left, moving in the mid-1920s to the center-right and right. The Nazi Party became the strongest party in 1932 and took over control of the state after Adolf Hitler became chancellor of Germany in 1933.

Following Germany's defeat in World War II, Württemberg was divided between the French and American zones of occupation. In 1952, after several intermediate combinations, it became part of the West German state of Baden-Württemberg.

== Background: German Empire ==
The Kingdom of Württemberg, created in 1806 during the Napoleonic Wars, became a member state of the German Empire when it was formed in 1871. As one of just four kingdoms in the new Empire (along with Prussia, Bavaria and Saxony), it was able to negotiate favourable terms before agreeing to join. In addition to obtaining special rights over its armed forces and taxation, Württemberg maintained its independence in matters of education, religious affairs, internal administration, the postal service and railways.

The Kingdom was a constitutional monarchy with a two-chamber parliament and a six-member Ministry of State as its government. The non-elected upper house consisted of members of the nobility, church dignitaries, representatives of the universities and appointees of the king. Following the electoral reform of 1906, the lower house was directly elected by male citizens over 25 years of age. Württemberg's last king was William II, who ruled from 1891 to 1918.

== German revolution ==
Until late September 1918, the German government had led its citizens to believe that the Central Powers would be victorious in World War I. When the Supreme Army Command abruptly admitted that the war was lost and that Germany needed to sue for peace, the public was deeply shocked. Four years of deprivation, hardship and suffering suddenly appeared to have been in vain, and the public mood rapidly darkened.

The discontent in Württemberg became manifest on 4 November 1918 when the communist Spartacus League sponsored a demonstration in Stuttgart, Württemberg's capital. Over 10,000 workers marched through the city centre and listened to Fritz Rück, leader of the city's Spartacists, call for the abdication of Emperor Wilhelm II and Württemberg's King William II. On the same day, a workers' and soldiers' council was formed at Stuttgart. The council was part of the revolutionary wave that had started in the final days of October when mutinous sailors sparked the German revolution by setting up a workers' and soldiers' council at Kiel and then rapidly spreading them across Germany.

In response to the events in both Württemberg and Germany as a whole, the government under Minister President Karl von Weizsäcker of the National Liberal Party resigned on 6 November. Three days later, a new State Ministry under Theodor Liesching of the Progressive People's Party ordered on behalf of King William that a constituent state assembly be convened. It was to be elected under universal suffrage and draft a democratic constitution for Württemberg. The announcement was intended to prevent the revolution from breaking out in Stuttgart, but by the time it was made it was already too late.

=== Revolution in Stuttgart ===
At a demonstration organised jointly by the moderate Social Democratic Party (SPD) and radical left Independent Social Democratic Party (USPD) on 9 November, Wilhelm Keil of the SPD proclaimed a "social republic" to a crowd of almost 100,000 in front of the New Castle in Stuttgart. Some revolutionaries, against the wishes of the demonstration's leaders, forced their way into the King's residence, the Wilhelm Palais, and replaced the royal standard flying over the building with the red flag of the revolution.

A provisional government consisting of members of the SPD and USPD was formed on the same afternoon when news reached Stuttgart that the Social Democrats in Berlin had proclaimed a German republic. Wilhelm Blos of the SPD and Arthur Crispien of the USPD were chosen to be leaders of the new government. Two days later it expanded beyond the socialist parties to include representatives of the liberal German Democratic Party (DDP) and Catholic Centre Party. The provisional government's most urgent priorities were security, order, providing the people of Württemberg with sufficient food and other necessities, and reintegrating demobilized soldiers into civilian life.

As reports of the revolutionary events in Stuttgart spread, local councils were formed at Heilbronn, Ludwigsburg and Ulm. On 12 November, Stuttgart workers elected a 15-member Greater Stuttgart Council made up of 11 SPD members and four from the USPD. The Württemberg soldiers' councils also chose a majority of SPD representatives when they elected a state committee on 17 November. A state convention of workers' councils on 8 December formed a Württemberg workers' executive committee that gave its support to the provisional government. As a result of the inability of radical elements to gain influence in the workers' and soldiers' councils anywhere in Württemberg, the state did not experience civil war-like conditions or set up a council republic. The majority of workers supported the SPD, which favoured a parliamentary republic and not the council republic that the more radical parties wanted.

=== Abdication of King William II ===
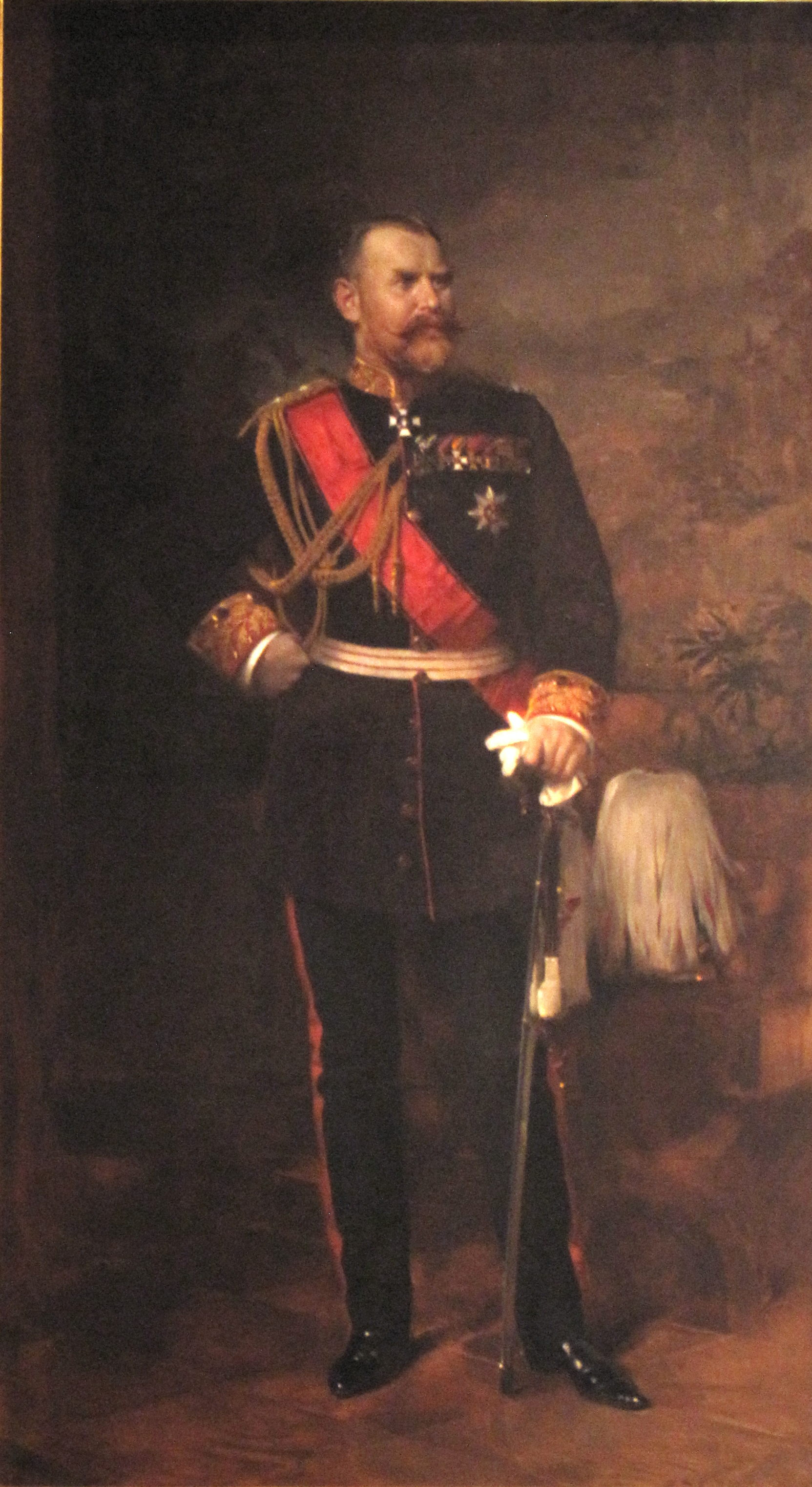
King William II of Württemberg in an 1896 portrait

On 16 November the King, who had left Stuttgart for Tübingen on the evening of the ninth, had a letter sent to the provisional government releasing all civil servants from their oath of allegiance to him. The civil service, by remaining unchanged and ensuring the continuity of administration, became an important source of support for the provisional government in its fight against radical forces. The workers' and soldiers' councils were limited to supervisory functions that did not significantly disrupt the administration. The Blos government quickly gained the trust of civil servants, teachers and clergy.

In an announcement to the people of Württemberg on 30 November, King William II voluntarily abdicated the throne and thanked all those who had served him and Württemberg during his 27-year reign. William was the last of Germany's ruling monarchs to step down from his throne. Even Emperor Wilhelm II had formally submitted his abdication two days previously.

The post-World War II mayor of Ulm, Theodor Pfizer, summed up the revolution in Württemberg in the following words:

The end of the monarchy brought about a turning point but not a profound break in the development of the state and its capital. The [royal] court, uniforms and orders disappeared, but the state apparatus and civil servants remained committed to their duties under the new regime ... The men of the new era, such as the Social Democrats Blos and Keil, were not inclined towards extremes. Perhaps too little room was given to new ideas in the bloodless revolution, and too much was left unchanged. But a profound change of heart was hardly necessary in Württemberg. The conservative citizens of the state who were loyal to the king were, like the king, tolerant and politically liberal, as their fathers had been, even if they voted for conservatives, and they were charitable, anointed with the often-invoked oil of democracy. They remained loyal to the state, even if they often railed against the Prussians, forgetting that behind the desks and counters in Württemberg sat South Prussians who meticulously enforced the laws that were conceived in Berlin and ridiculed in Bavaria.

=== Spartacist uprising and constituent state assembly ===
The Spartacist uprising, a communist-led putsch against the revolutionary government in Berlin on 5–12 January 1919, was echoed in Stuttgart. A number of deaths occurred on 10 January when insurgents who wanted a soviet-style republic attempted to take control of the printing presses of the Württemberg Zeitung, but overall the level of violence did not compare to that in Berlin. Minister President Blos dismissed USPD ministers Crispien and Fischer for their support of the Spartacists and barred the USPD from further participation in his government.

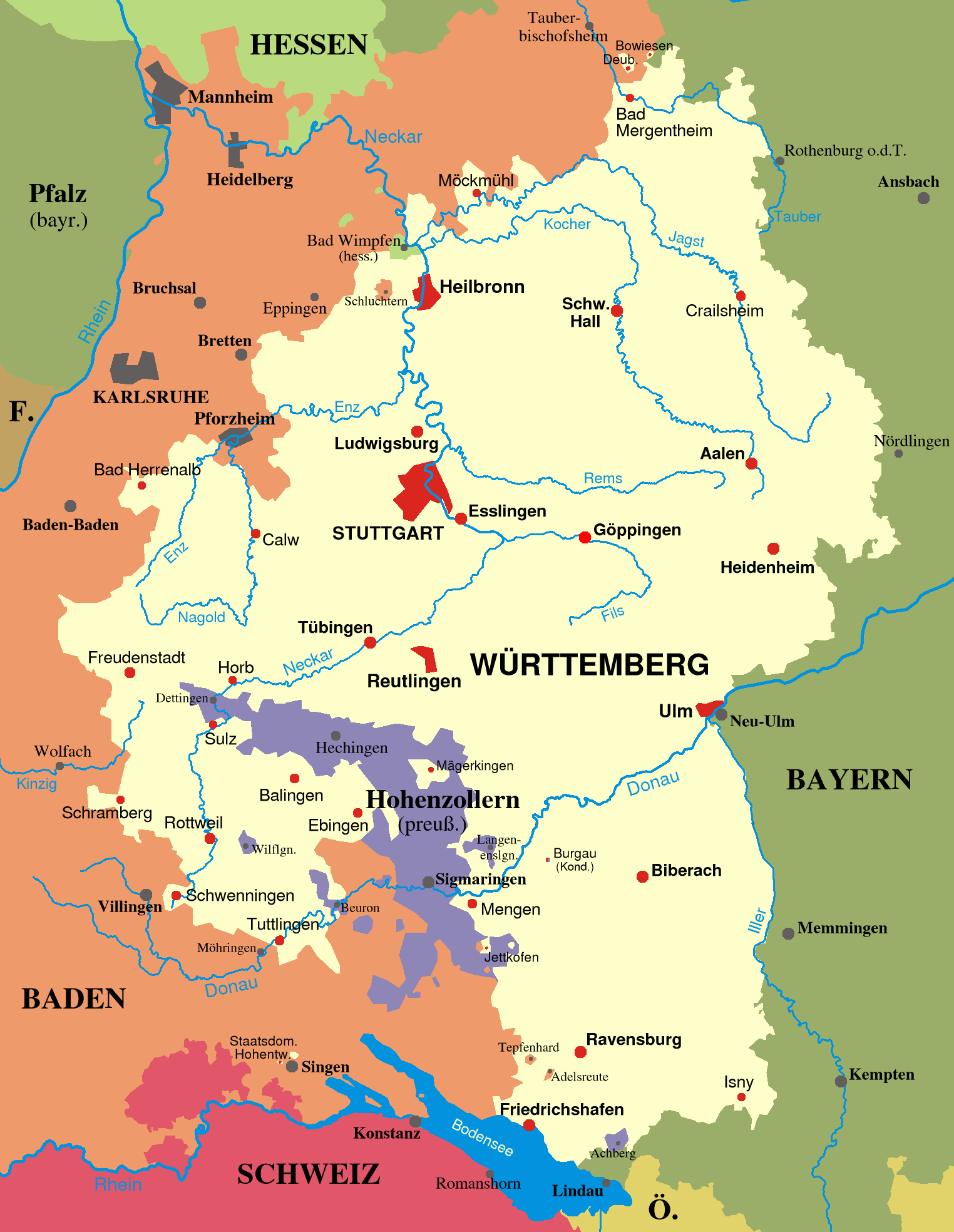
Württemberg at the end of World War I. Its boundaries did not change when it became the Free People's State of Württemberg.

The election to the constituent state assembly, which was to write a new constitution for Württemberg, took place on 12 January 1919. Even though the Spartacist uprising was then only just ending, there were no significant incidents that impeded the voting. The SPD, German Democratic Party (DDP) and Centre Party – the three moderate parties of the Weimar Coalition that built the new government at the national level – took 121 of the 150 seats. The USPD won just 3% of the vote and four seats. Thirteen members of the state assembly were women, among them Mathilde Planck and Clara Zetkin.

=== Second Spartacist uprising ===
In early March 1919, discontent among leftist workers in Berlin over the lack of progress towards implementation of some of their key revolutionary demands – socialisation of key industries and the legal safeguarding of workers' and soldiers' councils – erupted into violence that cost at least 1,200 lives in the Berlin March Battles. The same dissatisfaction led the Communist Party of Germany (KPD) in Württemberg to call for a general strike on 31 March. The Württemberg government imposed a state of siege and actively suppressed the general strike in Stuttgart and the surrounding area. In a battle between 400 Spartacists and government forces who deployed artillery, 16 people were killed and 50 wounded.

The Württemberg government also sent troops into Bavaria in April 1919 to help Prussian and Freikorps units put down the Bavarian Soviet Republic. Württemberg's SPD state chairman spoke out against the move but found no support in the government.

=== Constitution ===
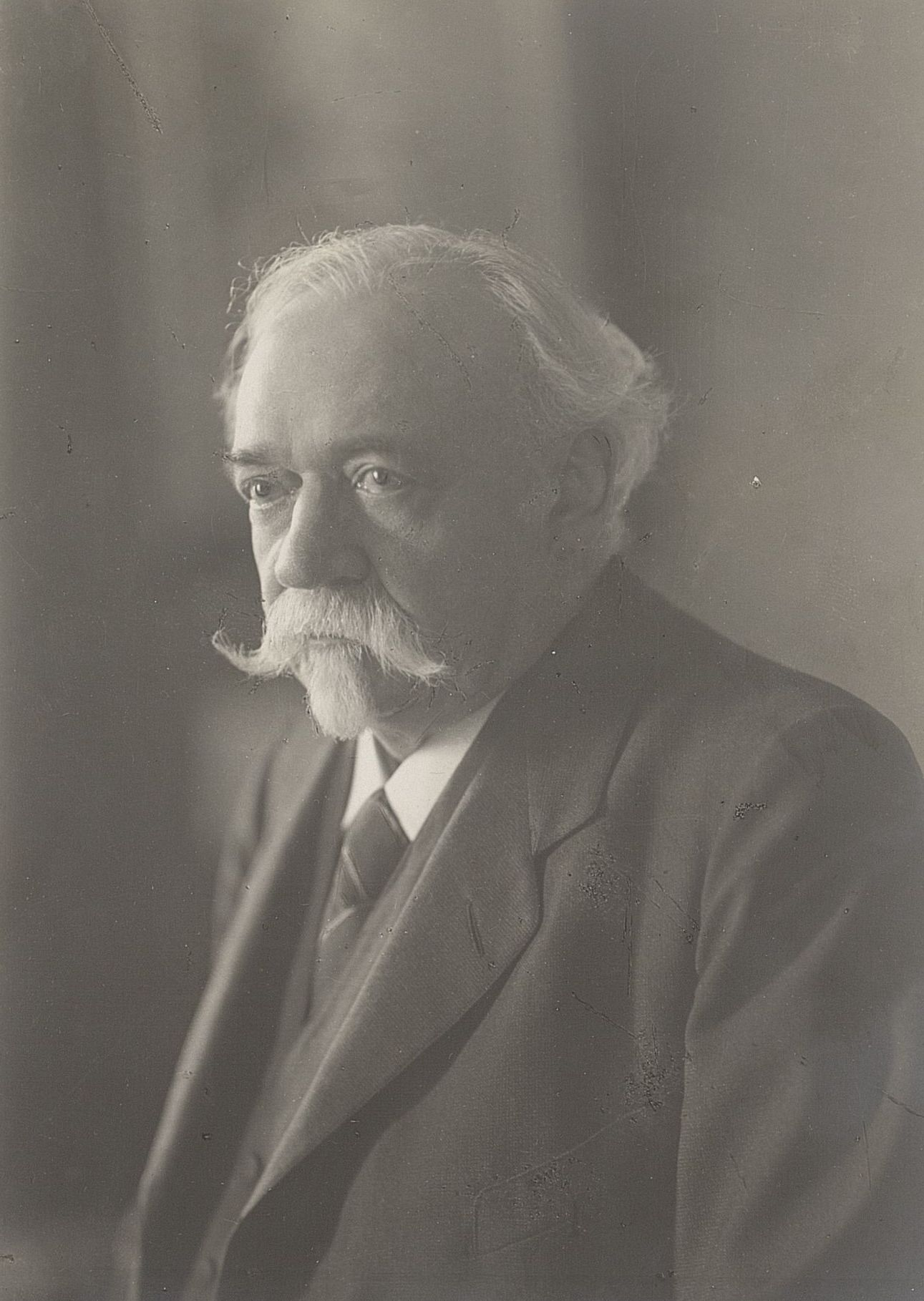
Wilhelm Blos, Württemberg's first minister president

Württemberg's new constitution was adopted by the constituent assembly on 26 April 1919 and came into force on 25 September 1919. It established a republican state with a one-chamber parliament (the Landtag) whose members were elected by all citizens aged 21 or older who were residents of Württemberg. The Landtag elected a minister president who headed the government and selected and dismissed the ministers. The government was responsible to the Landtag. The constitution included an extensive list of rights and duties of the citizens. On 4 October 1919, Wilhelm Blos was sworn in as Württemberg's first minister president.

Württemberg's workers' and soldiers' councils, which had by then lost their political significance, were formally abolished when the constitution became effective.

Wilhelm Blos later wrote about the birth of the Free People's State:

After all existing structures had been dismantled, the task was to protect the state from the threat of anarchy and the dictatorship of a violent minority. On the ruins of an old monarchy, a democratic republic in which the people of Württemberg could determine their own future had to be established. In cooperation with the workers' and soldiers' councils, it was possible to defeat the Spartacist coups of the winter and spring. Württemberg also successfully warded off the Bolshevik threat from Munich.

== Weimar Republic ==
=== Hieber government ===
In the first regular state election on 6 June 1920, the SPD and German Democratic Party (DDP) suffered a clear defeat, mirroring the national results of the election to the Reichstag that took place the same day. The terms of the Treaty of Versailles that had recently been made public angered many Germans and turned them against the parties of the Weimar Coalition, which had voted for it. The SPD, which led the Berlin government, had also lost many supporters because of the stark contrast between its light hand against the right-wing backers of the March 1920 Kapp Putsch and its harsh suppression of the 1919 Spartacist uprising. In Württemberg the SPD fell from 35% to 16% of the vote and the DDP from 25% to 15%. The Catholic Centre Party fared considerably better, rising from 21% to 22.5% to become the largest party in the Landtag. The USPD made major gains at the expense of the SPD and rose from 3% to 13%. The Württemberg Farmers' and Winegrowers' Association, a regional branch of the conservative-nationalist Agricultural League, was the second largest party at 18%. A minority DDP-Centre Party government with the toleration of the SPD was formed under the leadership of Johannes von Hieber of the DDP. One of the Hieber government's most significant actions was the passage of the Church Act of March 1924 which legally separated the state of Württemberg and the Evangelical Church.

On 26 August 1921, Matthias Erzberger, a Centre Party Reichstag representative from Württemberg and former German minister of Finance was assassinated by members of the far-right terrorist Organisation Consul; a month later Foreign Minister Walther Rathenau was assassinated by members of the same group. In response, many far-right organizations were banned under the 1922 Law for the Protection of the Republic, but not in Württemberg. The state police office reported that the associations had only a small following in Württemberg and concluded that they were to be considered harmless. The only measure taken was a decree issued by the minister of the Interior on 13 September 1922 which called on the district offices to pay particular attention to the Nazi Party (NSDAP) and the Deutschvölkischer Schutz- und Trutzbund. The Organisation Consul had already been banned nationwide.

Although the Volkish movement and Nazis engaged in some activities in Württemberg in the 1920s, they did not achieve any notable success. Even Adolf Hitler's eleven visits to Stuttgart between 1920 and 1932 did nothing to change the situation. During his Beer Hall Putsch in Munich in November 1923, the population of Württemberg on the whole remained calm.

=== Coalition of conservatives and Centre ===
In October 1922 the SPD gained strength in the Landtag through the national reunification of the USPD with the SPD. The Social Democrats' greater political weight encouraged them to claim the right to fill a vacant position in the Hieber cabinet, but the Centre Party rejected their request. During its period of toleration of the government, the SPD had failed to achieve its key social policy goals. It was unable to implement the eight-hour work day across the board, expand trade and commercial supervision, reform taxes in order to upgrade highly industrialised municipalities, or introduce a generally binding eighth year of school.

One month before the election of May 1924, the Hieber government resigned after the DDP withdrew its ministers. It was replaced by a transitional government headed by the independent Edmund Rau. The state election on 4 May 1924 led to a significant shift to the right. The parliamentary group formed by the Citizens' Party (the Württemberg branch of the conservative-nationalist German National People's Party, or DNVP) and the Farmers' and Winegrowers' Association succeeded in persuading the Centre Party to join a coalition government. The SPD remained in opposition.

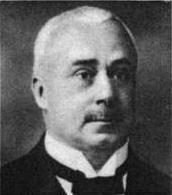
Wilhelm Bazille, minister president of Württemberg from 1924 to 1928

On 3 June 1924, Wilhelm Bazille of the DNVP (Citizens' Party) was elected minister president of Württemberg. A conservative anti-democrat and monarchist, Bazille governed until 1928 in a coalition that was stable by the standards of the time. It consisted of the Citizens' Party, the Centre Party and the Württemberg Farmers' and Winegrowers' Association.

Bazille was able to state in the Landtag that Württemberg had the lowest unemployment rate in Germany at the end of 1927. On the question of the relationship between the states and the federal government, a problem which remained open throughout the life of the Weimar Republic, Bazille took a position aimed at preserving the independence of the states and saw himself as the guardian of Württemberg's interests. He was the main target of the opposition parties in the campaign for the Reichstag and state election on 20 May 1928. Communists, Social Democrats and liberals strongly criticised Bazille for having prevented the introduction of an eighth year of elementary school. SPD politician Fritz Ulrich described the regime headed by Bazille, who was of French origin, as alien to the Swabians.

=== Bolz government ===
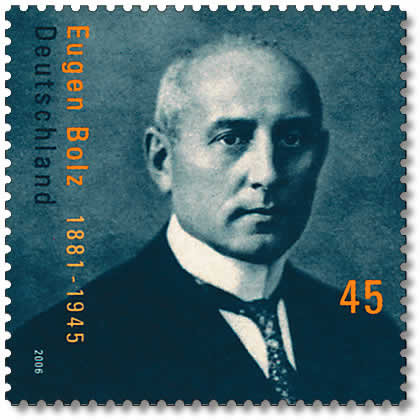
Image of Eugen Bolz on a 2006 German postage stamp. He was beheaded by the Nazi regime in 1945 for his activities in the resistance.

The state election on 20 May 1928 brought the SPD significant gains, making it the strongest party in the Landtag and causing the previous conservative coalition to lose its majority. Since the Centre Party, led by Eugen Bolz, did not want a coalition with the SPD, and the DDP refused to enter into a coalition with the DNVP, Bolz formed a minority government of the Centre and DNVP. The two parties attacked the SPD for not having a state political programme and being too focused on policies at the national level. They also wanted to preserve denominational primary schools in Württemberg, whereas the SPD preferred that they be of mixed confession.

In January 1930 Reinhold Maier (DDP) replaced Josef Beyerle of the Centre Party as minister of Economic Affairs and Johannes Rath (DVP) entered the cabinet as state councillor (Staatsrat), giving the Bolz government a stable majority in the Landtag. The changes were linked to the Württemberg government's intention to approve the Young Plan on Germany's war reparations when it came to a vote in the federal Reichsrat. Since the DNVP under Alfred Hugenberg was opposed to the Young Plan, there was a risk that the Württemberg government, with only four ministers, including two from the DNVP, would not have the necessary quorum to vote. After Maier joined the Württemberg government, the Young Plan was quickly approved. The representatives of the anti-republican parties (NSDAP, DNVP, KPD) called the Bolz government's behaviour treasonous towards the German people and said that it should not have bowed to the will of the national government.

=== Landtag elections ===
Landtag of Württemberg – seats by party
Party	1919	1920	1924	1928	1932	1933
Centre Party	31	23	17	17	17	10
Christian Social People's Service (CSVD)	.	.	.	3	3	2
Communist Party (KPD)	.	–	10	6	7	[6] (Note: The Nazi Party excluded the KPD members following the reconfiguration of the Landtag which took place after the 5 March 1933 Reichstag election.)
German Democratic Party (DDP / DStP)	38	15	9	8	4	1
German People's Party (DVP)	.	4	3	4	–	–
Independent Social Democratic Party (USPD)	4	14	.	.	.	.
Nazi Party (NSDAP)	.	.	3 (Note: Running as the Völkisch-Social Bloc. The Nazi Party was temporarily banned after Hitler's failed Beer Hall Putsch in 1923.)	–	23	26
Social Democratic Party (SPD)	52	17	13	22	14	9
Württemberg Citizens' Party (WBP / DNVP)	11	10	8	4	3	3
Württemberg Small Farmers' and Winegrowers' League (WBWB)	14	18	17	16	9	3
Total Seats	150	101	80	80	80	[60]

== Final years ==
=== Deadlock ===
In the 24 April 1932 Landtag election, the NSDAP emerged as the strongest party with 23 seats, followed by the Centre with 17 and the SPD with 14. Christian Mergenthaler (NSDAP) was elected Landtag president. None of the eight candidates for minister president received the absolute majority required for election. Jonathan Schmid of the NSDAP received 22 votes and Bolz 20 of the 41 needed. Because of the deadlock, the Bolz government remained in office on a caretaker basis. Following the example of Chancellor Heinrich Brüning, who led the first of the Weimar Republic's presidential cabinets, Bolz governed primarily through emergency decrees without the involvement of the Landtag.

In June 1932, Bolz and his south German counterparts, Josef Schmitt of Baden and Heinrich Held of Bavaria, tried in vain to persuade German President Paul von Hindenburg not to oust Prussia's elected government and appoint Chancellor Franz von Papen Prussian Reichskommissar (the Prussian coup d'état). They knew that the move would lead to a major weakening of federalism and were convinced that it constituted a breach of the Weimar Constitution. On 23 July 1932, three days after Hindenburg signed the emergency decree, Papen met with the minister presidents of the southern German states in Stuttgart to discuss how a Hitler dictatorship could be prevented and to assure them that the states of southern Germany would remain untouched. The meeting proved to be meaningless.

=== Road to dictatorship ===
Adolf Hitler's appointment to the Reich chancellorship on 30 January 1933 marked the beginning of the end of the individual German states' sovereignty. The national Reichstag was dissolved and a new election held on 5 March. The NSDAP received 42% of the vote in Württemberg, slightly below the 44% nationally. On 8 March, the Reich government used the Reichstag Fire Decree to appoint Dietrich von Jagow as Reich commissioner for Württemberg. Many members of the opposition were subsequently arrested.

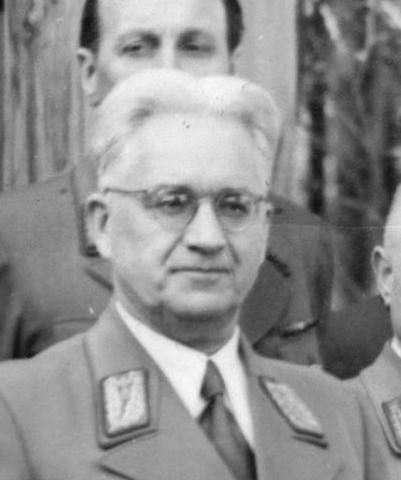
Wilhelm Murr, Nazi Gauleiter and Reichsstatthalter (governor) of Württemberg

The Landtag was reconfigured based on the results of the 5 March Reichstag election, giving the NSDAP 42% of the seats. The Landtag then elected Wilhelm Murr, Württemberg's Nazi Gauleiter, minister president on 15 March 1933. Thirty-six members of parliament voted for Murr, the Centre Party and the DDP with their 19 votes abstained, and the 13 members of the SPD voted against him. The KPD had been excluded from the Landtag.

The second Law for the Coordination of the States of 7 April 1933 created the office of Reich governor (Reichsstatthalter). Wilhelm Murr took the office in Württemberg. He was superior to the state government, which was led by Christian Mergenthaler, Murr's replacement as minister president, and was accountable only to Reich Chancellor Hitler. The last session of the Württemberg Landtag took place on 8 June 1933. The Württemberg enabling act passed during the session repealed the Württemberg Constitution of 1919 and transferred legislative power to the state government. The Reich Law of 30 January 1934 abolished all German state parliaments and transferred the sovereign rights of the states to the Reich. Like the other state governments, the Württemberg State Ministry was reduced to a mid-level authority in the Reich.

=== Dictatorship and its consequences ===
==== 1933 to 1945 ====
Nazi rule in Württemberg was characterised by the rivalry between Gauleiter and Reich Governor Murr and Minister President Mergenthaler, who was formally subordinate to Murr. Even though their dislike of one another erupted into open hostility, Hitler kept them in their positions.

As in the rest of the Reich, Jews in Württemberg were persecuted and murdered, the opposition was eliminated and the administration was brought into line with Nazi policies. Among the most notorious Nazi criminals from Württemberg were SS-Obergruppenführer Gottlob Berger, SS-Brigade Leader Walter Stahlecker and the Nazi district leader of Heilbronn, Richard Drauz. Resistance fighters from Württemberg included Georg Elser, the founders of the White Rose resistance group Hans and Sophie Scholl, the brothers Berthold and Claus Schenk Graf von Stauffenberg of the 20 July plot against Hitler, and Eugen Bolz, who was executed late in the war. Active resistance against National Socialism, however, remained the exception in Württemberg, as it did throughout the Reich.

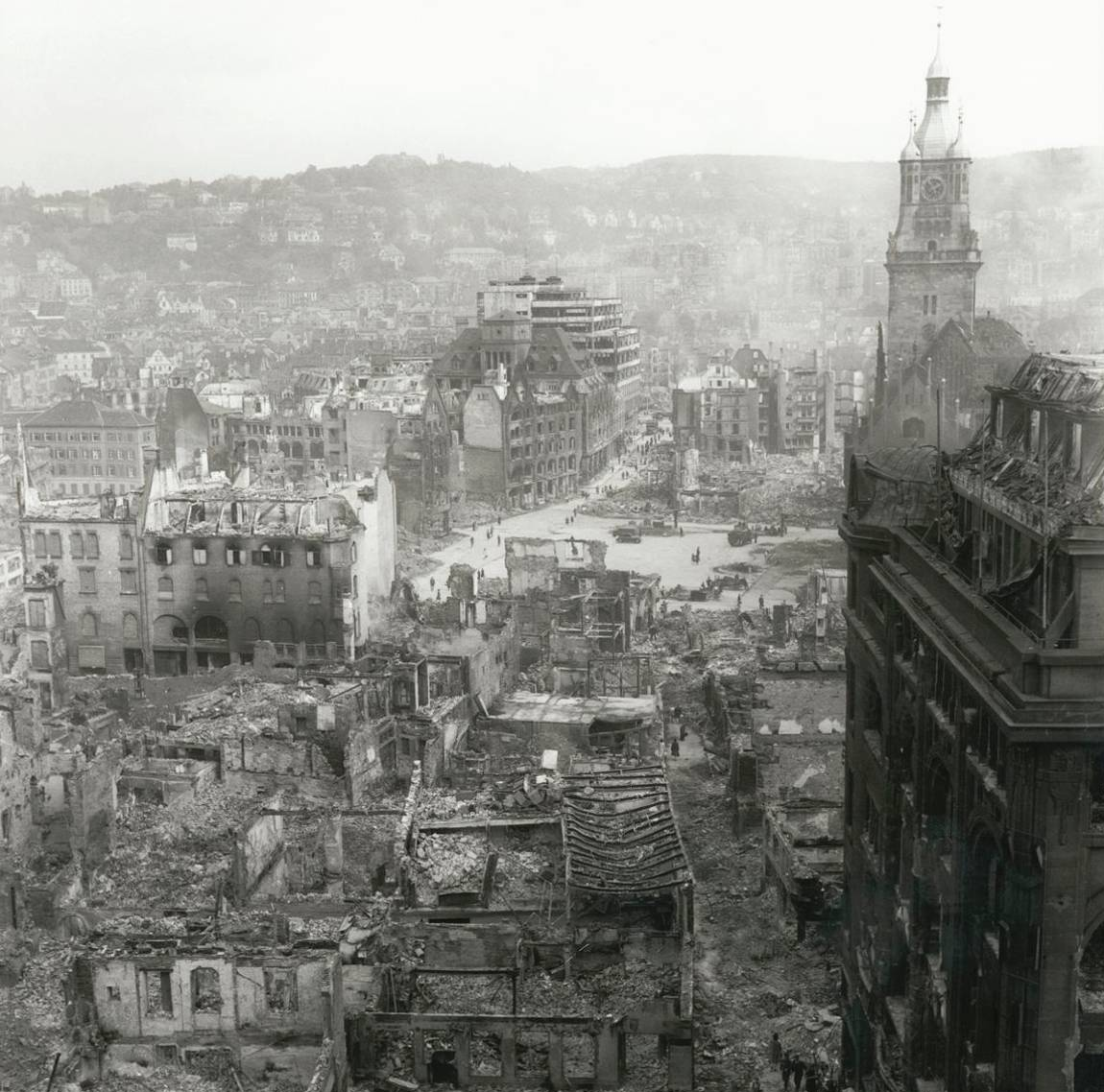
View towards Stuttgart's bombed-out market square on 1 November 1944. City Hall is on the right.

During the bombing campaign against German cities that began in 1943, Stuttgart suffered a total of 4,562 deaths in 53 air raids, while Heilbronn, which was severely damaged on 4 December 1944, counted around 6,500 deaths. The cities of Ulm, Reutlingen and Friedrichshafen also suffered particularly badly. During the ground battles that accompanied the capture of Württemberg by American and French troops in 1945, the towns of Crailsheim, Waldenburg and Freudenstadt, among others, were almost completely destroyed.

==== Post-war ====
After the Second World War, the northern region of Württemberg became part of the American occupation zone, while the southern part was in the French zone. In 1945/46, the military governments of the occupation zones established the states of Württemberg-Baden in the American zone and South Baden and Württemberg-Hohenzollern in the French zone. They became states of the Federal Republic of Germany (West Germany) when it was founded on 23 May 1949.

Article 118 of the Basic Law for the Federal Republic of Germany enabled measures to be taken to reorganise the three states. They merged to form the federal state of Baden-Württemberg on 25 April 1952.

== See also ==
- List of ministers-president of Baden-Württemberg#Presidents of the Free People's State of Württemberg (1918–1945)
- List of presidents of the Landtag of the Free People's State of Württemberg
