= Bazille =

Bazille is a surname. Notable people with the surname include:

- Auguste Bazille (1828–1879), French composer and organist
- Frédéric Bazille (1841–1879), French painter
- Helmut Bazille (1920–1973), German politician
- Wilhelm Bazille (1874–1934), German lawyer and politician
