= The Hunt Breakfast (Courbet) =

1858 painting by Gustave Courbet

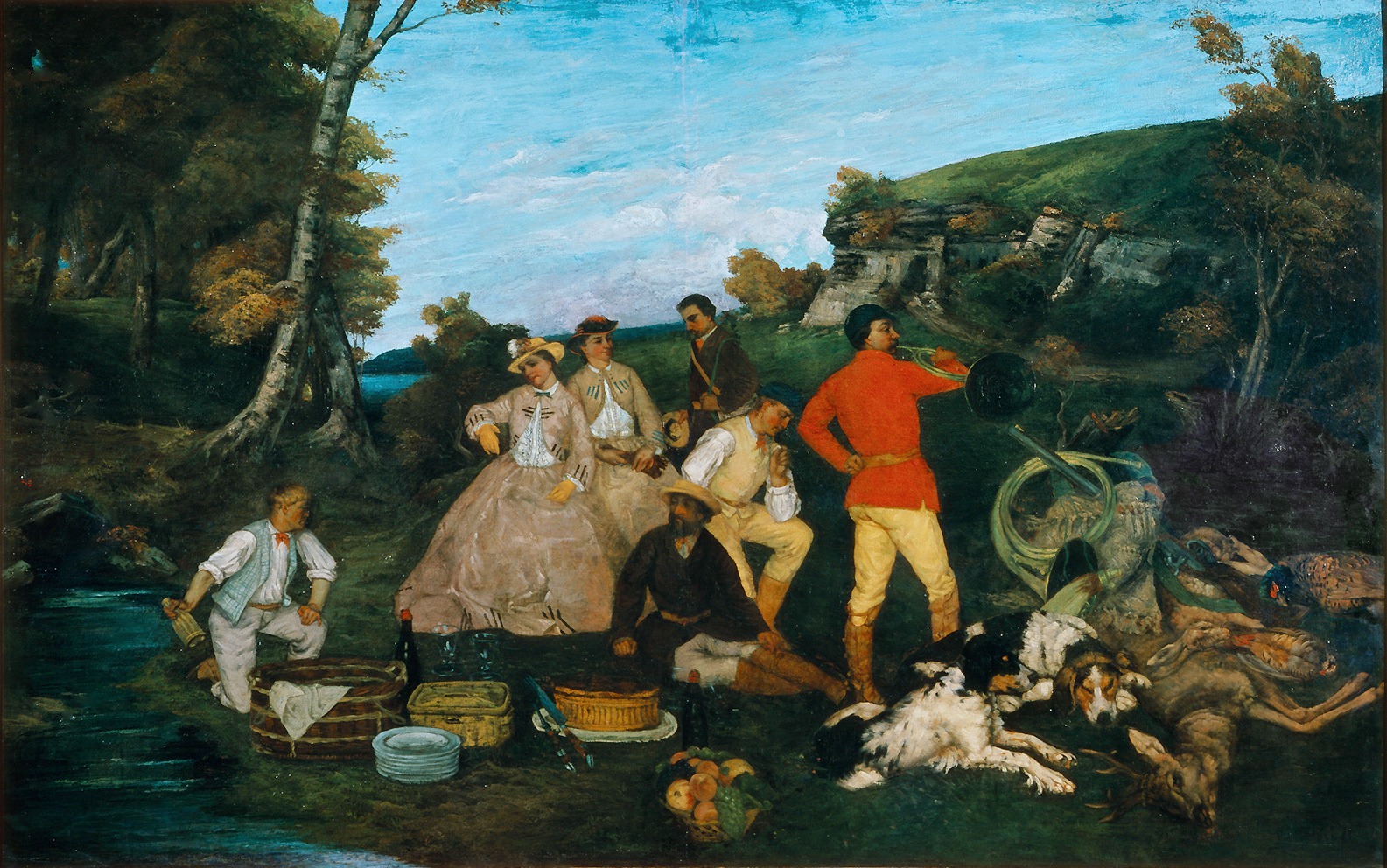
- Artist: Gustave Courbet
- Year: 1858
- Type: oil on canvas
- Dimensions: 207 cm × 325 cm (81 in × 128 in)
- Location: Wallraf-Richartz Museum, Cologne

The Hunt Breakfast is a large oil-on-canvas painting completed in 1858 by the French Realist painter Gustave Courbet which is now in the collection of the Wallraf–Richartz Museum in Cologne, Germany. It was painted in Germany during a long stay by the artist in Frankfurt and has probably never left the country.

The picture depicts an al fresco meal by a deer hunting party and is an early example of the Realism genre of which Courbet was a pioneer. Realism demanded that such genuine events, as distinct from highly structured imaginary mythological or religious compositions, should be faithfully recorded, as it was in this case.

Seven years later Claude Monet would paint his masterpiece Le Dejeuner sur l'herbe, in which Courbet himself featured, on an even larger scale.

== See also ==
- 100 Great Paintings, 1980 BBC series
