= Wilhelm Murr =

German Nazi, Gauleiter, SS-Obergruppenführer (1899–1952)

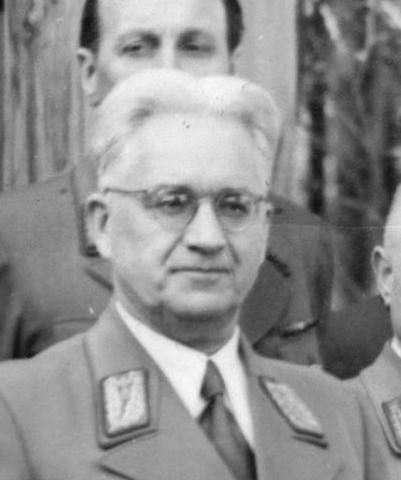
- Murr in 1943

Gauleiter of Gau Württemberg-Hohenzollern
- In office 1 February 1928 – 8 May 1945
- Appointed by: Adolf Hitler
- Preceded by: Eugen Munder
- Succeeded by: Post abolished

Reichsstatthalter of Württemberg
- In office 6 May 1933 – 19 April 1945
- Appointed by: Adolf Hitler

6th State President of Württemberg
- In office 15 March 1933 – 12 May 1933
- Preceded by: Eugen Bolz
- Succeeded by: Christian Mergenthaler

Personal details
- Born: 16 December 1888 Esslingen am Neckar, Kingdom of Württemberg, German Empire
- Died: 14 May 1945 (aged 56) Vorarlberg, Allied-occupied Austria
- Cause of death: Suicide
- Party: Nazi Party

Military service
- Allegiance: German Empire
- Branch/service: Imperial German Army
- Years of service: 1914–1919
- Rank: Vize-Feldwebel; SS-Obergruppenführer
- Battles/wars: World War I
- Awards: Iron Cross, 2nd class Knights Cross of the War Merit Cross

Wilhelm Murr (16 December 1888 – 14 May 1945) was a Nazi German politician. From 1928 until his death he was Gauleiter of Gau Württemberg-Hohenzollern, and from early 1933 held the offices of State President and Reichsstatthalter (Reich Governor) of Württemberg. During World War II he also rose to the rank of SS-Obergruppenführer in addition to his Party posts. At war's end he committed suicide with poison while in French custody.

== Early life ==
Murr was born in Esslingen am Neckar. He grew up in Esslingen in poverty and lost both parents at the age of 14. He attended the Volksschule up to the 7th class. After commercial training, he completed military service from 1908 to 1910 and then worked as a salesman at the Maschinenfabrik Esslingen. During the First World War he served on all fronts, advanced to the rank of Vize-Feldwebel (Sergeant 1st Class), was wounded in action and received the Iron Cross, 2nd class. He spent the end of the war in 1918 injured in a military hospital in Cottbus and was discharged in March 1919.

Murr became deeply involved in the Deutschnationaler Handlungsgehilfen-Verband ("German National Trade Assistants' Union"; DHV), a Völkisch, rightwing, antisemitic employees' union that he had joined even before the war. There he came into contact with the antsemite Theodor Fritsch's writings and was greatly influenced by them. Around this time, he also joined the Deutschvölkischer Schutz- und Trutzbund, the largest, most active and most influential antisemitic organization in the Weimar Republic. He then joined the Nazi Party in the summer of 1923, and after the Party was temporarily banned, he joined it again in August 1925. He eagerly recruited new members to the party at his workplace. A workers' newspaper criticized him in September 1927, saying that Murr's only job there was "to smuggle Hakenkreuzler ('crooked-cross devotees') into the works". It was also at this time that Murr got to know Richard Drauz, the later Nazi Kreisleiter of Heilbronn, whom Murr often patronized.

== Rise to power ==
After fierce intra-party fighting, the local Esslingen leader Murr, who attracted attention for his ruthless and unscrupulous methods, was able to oust the incumbent NSDAP Gauleiter Eugen Munder from power. On 1 February 1928, Adolf Hitler appointed Murr to NSDAP Gauleiter in Württemberg-Hohenzollern. Another of his rivals he managed to bypass for promotion was Christian Mergenthaler. Murr was able to consolidate his position in Württemberg through strict subordination to Hitler and the Party.

In October 1930, he gave up his job at the machine factory and began working full-time for the Party. The NSDAP's membership numbers and financial situation in Württemberg improved. Early in 1931 Murr introduced his own propaganda newspaper, the NS-Kurier, in which he published numerous editorials which, if not intellectually brilliant, faithfully gave the official party line right up until 1945.

In the general election of September 1930, Murr was elected a member of the Reichstag for the NSDAP in electoral constituency 31 (Württemberg). He left the parliament in May 1932 after he was elected to the Landtag of Württemberg in April 1932, and he served as the leader of the Nazi faction. After the Nazis seized power and under Nazi pressure, the Württemberg Landtag chose Murr as Württemberg's new State President, thereby leading him to succeed his other political foe, Eugen Bolz. Murr also took over the Interior and Economic Affairs Ministries at the same time.

On 6 May 1933, Murr was appointed to the newly created position of Reichsstatthalter (Reich Governor) in Württemberg; the office of Württemberg State President was abolished and the Landtag deprived of any function. His rival Mergenthaler, since early 1932 already Landtag president, became Murr's Prime Minister as well as Culture and Justice Minister. Murr's obvious intellectual shortcomings were touted as "populist" and he was described in Nazi propaganda as a "Man of the People". Joseph Goebbels, however, described Murr in a diary entry from 31 July 1933 as a "nouveau riche social climber."

At the November 1933 election, Murr was again returned to the Reichstag and retained that seat until the fall of the Nazi regime in May 1945. On 4 September 1935, Murr was named to Hans Frank's Academy for German Law. Murr's governance was notable for its petty ruthlessness. When Murr found out in 1938 that the Bishop of Rottenburg, Johannes Baptista Sproll, had not participated in the compulsory referendum on Austria's union with Germany, he initiated a campaign of newspaper articles and organized demonstrations which forced the bishop out of the province to Bavaria.

== World War II ==
When war began in September 1939, Murr was appointed Reich Defense Commissioner of Wehrkreis (Military District) V, which included not only his Gau, but neighboring Gau Baden. This brought him enormous power, as important sectors of military and civil administration were now directly or at least de facto subject to his direct control. Virtually nothing could happen in Württemberg without the consent of Murr or his agents. A member of the SS since 1934, he was promoted to SS-Obergruppenführer on 30 January 1942. The Holocaust carried out against Jews and the mentally ill went ahead smoothly in Württemberg thanks to Murr carrying out the Führer's and the Party's orders unconditionally.

On 16 November 1942, the jurisdiction of the Reich Defense Commissioners was changed from the Wehrkreis to the Gau level, and Murr remained Commissioner for only his Gau. After the increasing severity of air raids on Stuttgart in 1943, Murr had the first inkling of a nasty end. He secretly prepared evacuation measures for Stuttgart, but remained a faithful spokesman for Hitler and Goebbels in public. Even when late in January 1944 Murr's only son Winfried, deployed with the Waffen-SS in Belgium, shot himself at the age of 21 to forestall court-martial proceedings for rape, Murr did not bring his loyalty to Hitler into question, going so far as to assure the Führer on 1 March that he would continue in his service.

== The war's end and afterwards ==
When Murr's nascent evacuation plans for Stuttgart became known in December 1944, which called for the city to be destroyed and the population led on 20-kilometer-per-day marches to the southeast, grumbling ensued and Murr gave up the plan by March 1945. On 10 April he called for the city to be defended to the utmost and forbade destruction of tank traps or the raising of white flags under threat of execution and Sippenhaft (detention of an offender's family). However, Murr himself fled Stuttgart on 19 April under a false name together with his wife and other companions. By way of Schelklingen, Kißlegg, Wangen im Allgäu, Kressbronn am Bodensee and further stops, the refugee convoy finally arrived in the Great Walser Valley in the Austrian province of Vorarlberg.

Murr, his wife and two aides stayed at the Biberacher Hütte in the Alps until 12 May, then moved into an alpine cabin overlooking Schröcken. There, on 13 May, they were arrested by French troops, to whom Murr identified himself as "Walter Müller". The arrestees were first taken to Schoppernau, then to Egg, in Vorarlberg, where Murr and his wife committed suicide using poison capsules they had carried with them. Both were buried in the graveyard at Egg.

The American occupiers had put Murr on their List of Potential War Criminals under Proposed US Policy Directives and were searching for him. The Americans and the French soon came to suspect that Murr might be dead, and with the Württemberg police found evidence that led them to Egg. On 16 April 1946, the grave of "Walter Müller" and his wife was opened. His former dentist uniquely identified Murr on the basis of his teeth.

== See also ==
- List of SS-Obergruppenführer

== Sources ==
- Höffkes, Karl (1986). Hitlers Politische Generale. Die Gauleiter des Dritten Reiches: ein biographisches Nachschlagewerk. Tübingen: Grabert-Verlag. ISBN 3-87847-163-7.
- Miller, Michael D.; Schulz, Andreas (2017). Gauleiter: The Regional Leaders of the Nazi Party and Their Deputies, 1925-1945. Vol. 2 (Georg Joel - Dr. Bernhard Rust). R. James Bender Publishing. ISBN 978-1-932-97032-6.
