= Le Déjeuner sur l'herbe (Monet, Paris) =

Painting by Claude Monet

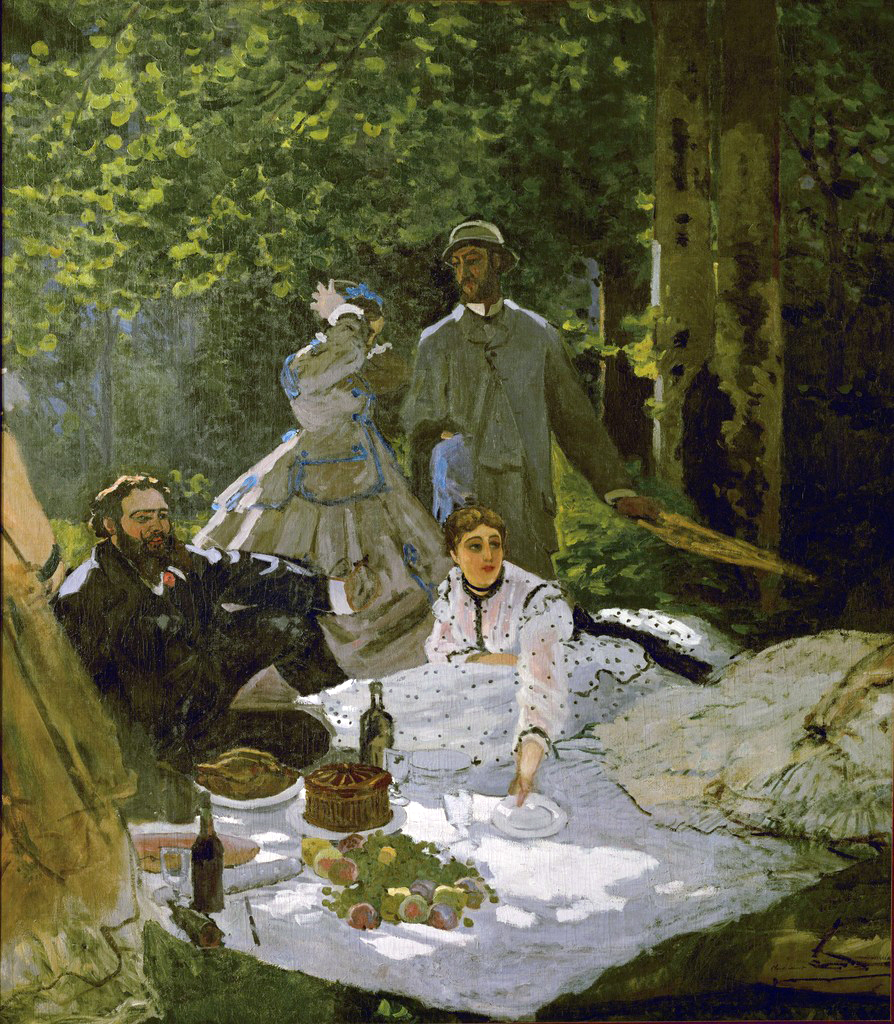
- Central panel, Musée d'Orsay
- Artist: Claude Monet
- Medium: Oil on canvas
- Dimensions: 248.9 cm × 218.0 cm (98.0 in × 85.8 in)
- Location: Musée d'Orsay, Paris

Le Déjeuner sur l'herbe (English: Luncheon on the Grass) is an 1865–1866 oil-on-canvas painting by Claude Monet, produced in response to the 1863 work of the same title by Édouard Manet. It remains unfinished, but two large fragments (central and left panels) are now in the Musée d'Orsay in Paris, while a smaller 1866 version is now in the Pushkin Museum in Moscow. Monet originally wanted to submit the painting to the Salon of 1866, but he underestimated how long it would take him to transfer his sketches to a life-size canvas, so it remained unfinished by the time of the exhibition.

Monet later offered the large canvas of Déjeuner to his landlord in place of rent. When Monet bought it back from his landlord, it was badly damaged from the damp environment in which it was stored. Monet had to cut it up in order to preserve the non-damaged parts.

== Description ==
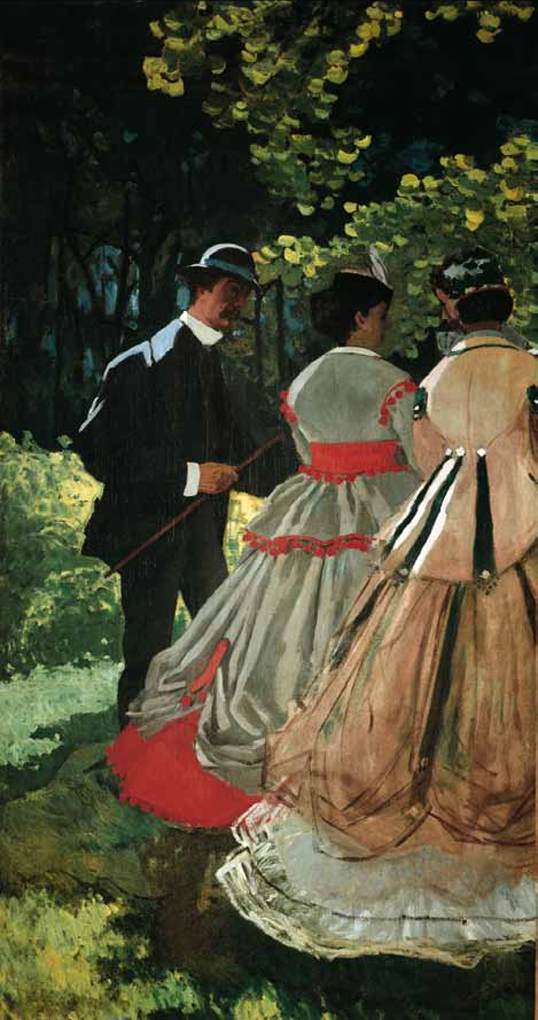
Claude Monet, Le Déjeuner sur l'herbe (left panel), Musée d'Orsay, Paris

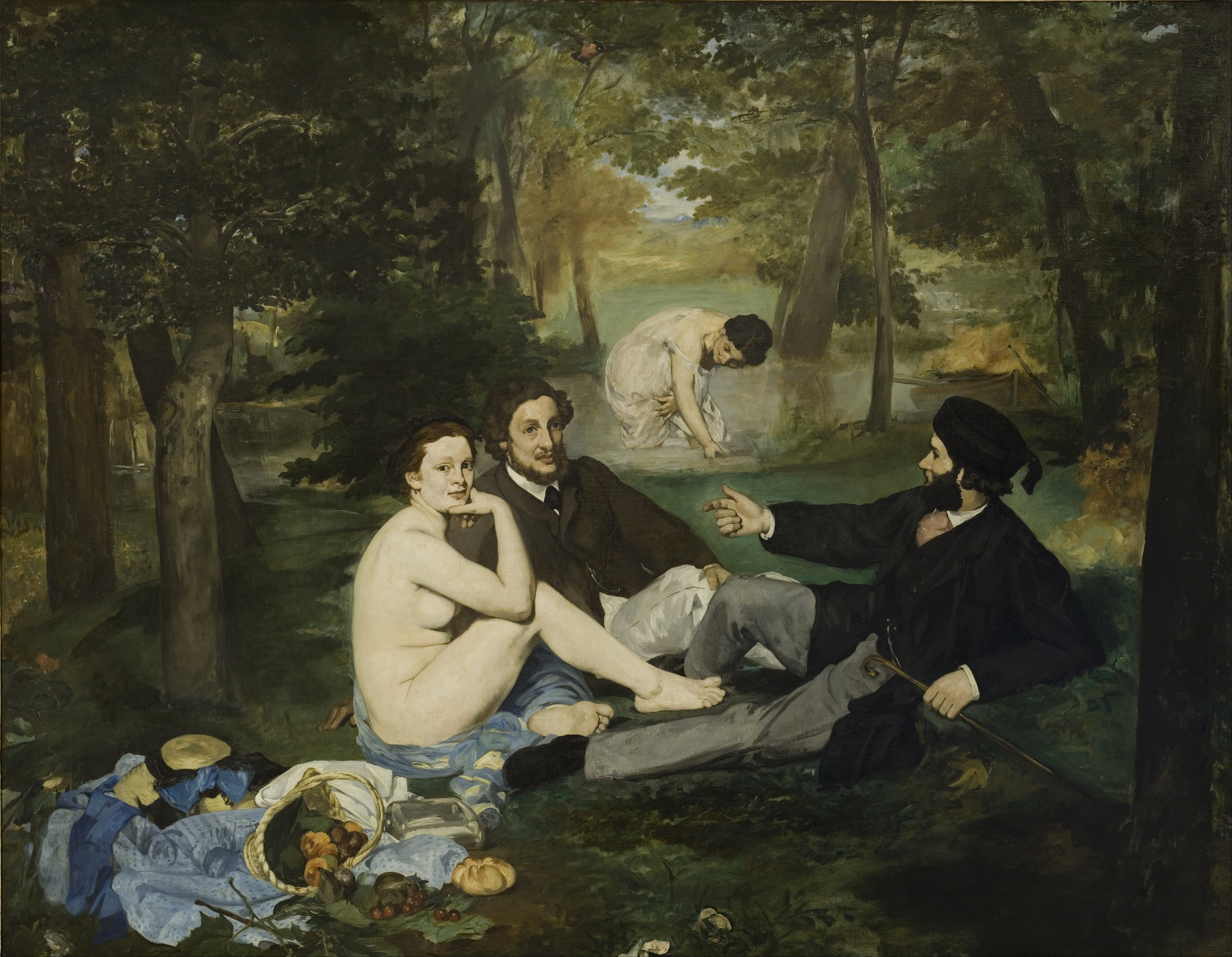
Edouard Manet, Le Déjeuner sur l'herbe, 1863

The painting depicts twelve people clothed in the Parisian fashion of the time. They are having a picnic near a forest glade. The people are gathered around a white picnic blanket, surrounded by fruits, cake and wine. The mood in this natural space is primarily created by the play of light and shadow, caused by the deciduous tree above them. Monet favored light-tone priming to help achieve the luminosity in his paintings. According to John House, the lighting in Monet's version of the scene resembles “sparkling light effects” of nature, which differs from Manet's original, which appears illuminated by studio light.

While Monet’s painting was inspired by Manet, it carries a different message from the original work. Joel Isaacson observes that at the time the dream of every painter, according to Émile Zola, was to "put life-size figures in a landscape". According to Isaacson, Monet intended to paint the picnic in a contemporary and objective manner, thus avoiding “artificialities” in Manet’s version. John House similarly observes that Monet hoped to depict “freshness and immediacy” and he did so through having an informal figure grouping.

== Influence ==
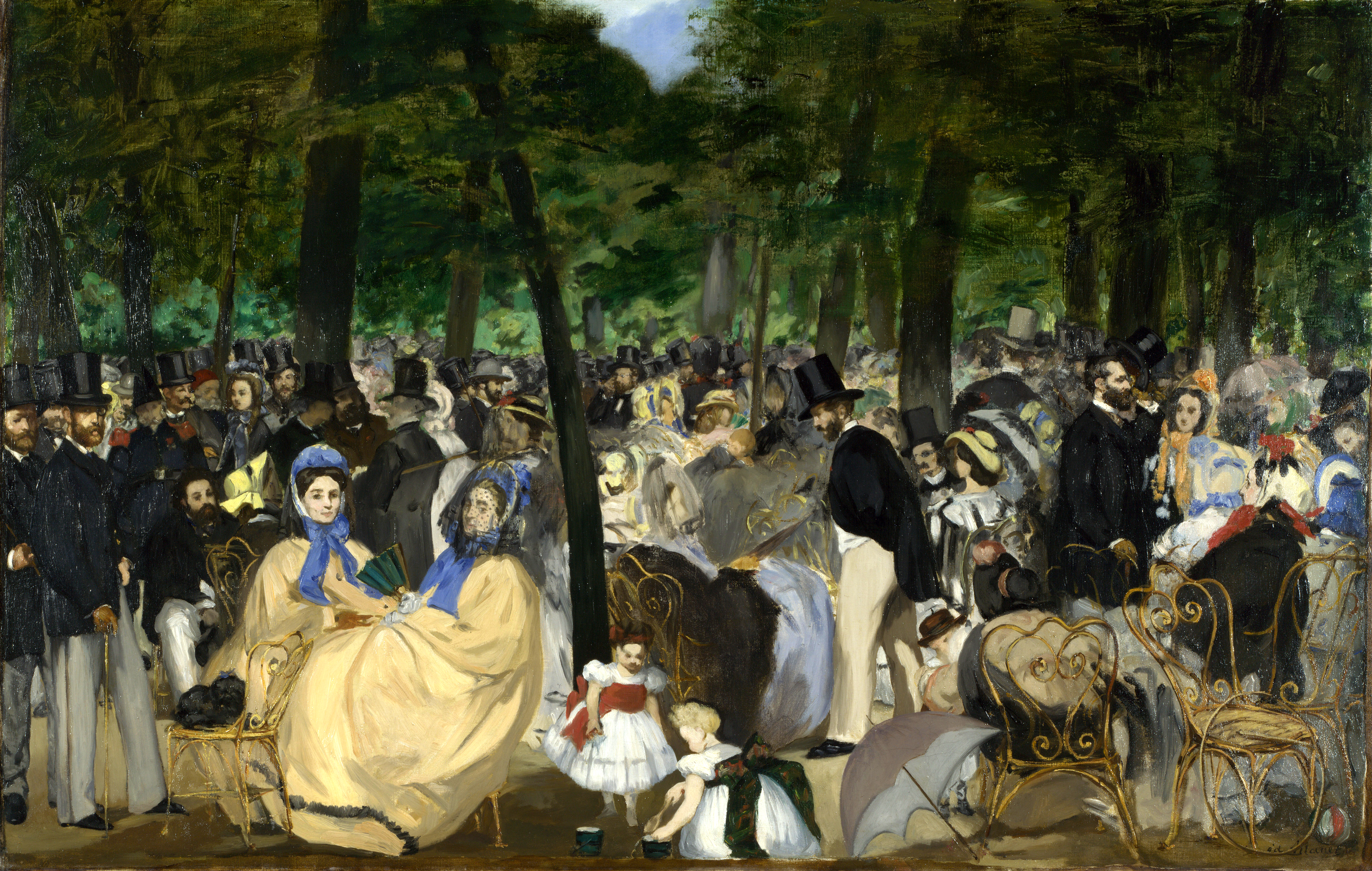
Edouard Manet, Music in the Tuileries, 1862

Many different paintings have been said to have influenced Monet's Le Déjeuner sur l'herbe. Joel Isaacson believes that, in addition to being influenced by the original Déjeuner, Monet also drew elements from Manet's Music in the Tuileries. Mary Gedo Matthews believes that in his painting Monet did not hope to pay homage to Manet but instead wanted to demonstrate that his vision was superior. Gedo also suggests that the artists' different approaches came from their dissimilar personalities and socioeconomic status. She notes that Manet took pride in distancing himself from public displays of emotions in his paintings, whereas Monet was more direct with his feelings.

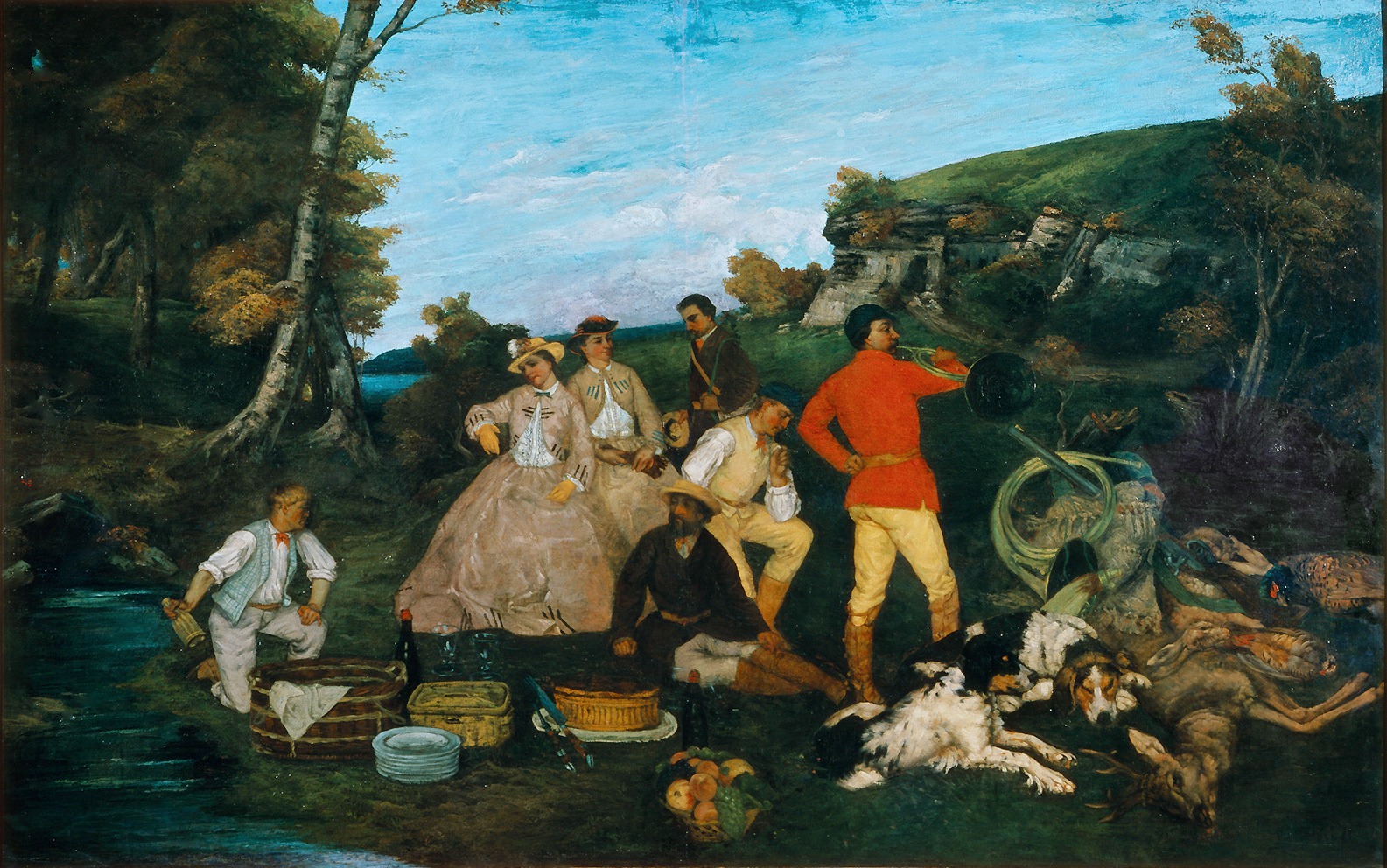
Gustave Courbet, The Hunt Breakfast, 1858

It is possible that some of Gustave Courbet’s work, such as The Hunt Breakfast, influenced Monet as well. Gedo notes the similarity of the breakfast scenes depicted and the large scale of both paintings. Monet portrayed Courbet in the painting, as well as his dear friend Bazille, whom he depended on heavily and depicted four times in the original composition of the painting (as visible in the Moscow version), before it was cut up.

== Stylistic elements ==
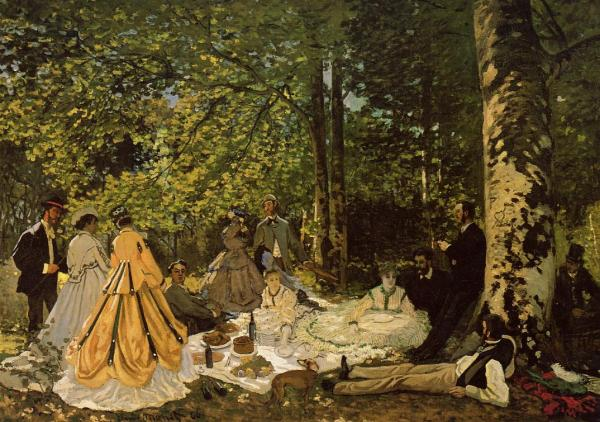
Claude Monet, Le Déjeuner sur l'herbe, full sketch showing the composition of the finished work before it was cut down. (Pushkin Museum, Moscow)

Monet's use of color is notable throughout the painting. He used bright accents on the dress in the left panel. André Dombrowski describes it as "an unnatural visual siren that pierces the overall harmony of the scene." According to Dombrowski, Déjeuner promotes both the feeling of sensory integration and an awareness of discrete pictorial units. The painting stands out through its bold and emphatic brushwork; Monet is known for having had nervous and intense brushwork. The Impressionist painter was too impatient to create a gradient, so there are large patches of light. According to Stephan Koja, Monet's techniques and style were intended to make the scene appear entirely in the present, modern and contemporary, without the use of tradition, in contrast to Manet’s approach.

== Pushkin version ==
The version of the painting now in the Pushkin Museum has often been considered a preparatory sketch for the final work. The Pushkin Museum, however, now states that this version is likely a later repetition of the finished work, based on the careful attention to detail and the presence of the artist's signature.

The Pushkin version was in the collection of the opera singer Jean-Baptiste Faure for a time. It may have been exhibited at the 1900 exhibition of Monet's works at the Durand-Ruel Gallery. Sergei Shchukin bought the painting from the art dealer Paul Cassirer sometime between 1901 and 1908.

Shchukin's collection was seized by the Soviet state in May 1918, with Le Déjeuner initially going to the State Museum of New Western Art and then, from 1948, being hung in its present home.

== See also ==
- List of paintings by Claude Monet
