= Württemberg Landtag elections in the Weimar Republic =

German state elections 1919–1932

Landtag elections in the Free People's State of Württemberg (German: Freie Volksstaat Württemberg) during the Weimar Republic were held on five occasions between 1919 and 1932. The percentage of the vote won and the number of seats allocated to each party are presented in the table below. The table is an important indicator of the swings in political opinion in this part of Germany between the German Empire and Nazi Germany, a period when parliamentary democracy came to have real political meaning in Germany.

On 31 March 1933, the sitting Landtag was dissolved by the Nazi-controlled central government and reconstituted to reflect the distribution of seats in the national Reichstag. The Landtag subsequently was formally abolished as a result of the "Law on the Reconstruction of the Reich" of 30 January 1934 which replaced the German federal system with a unitary state. Württemberg is now a part of the federal state of Baden-Württemberg.

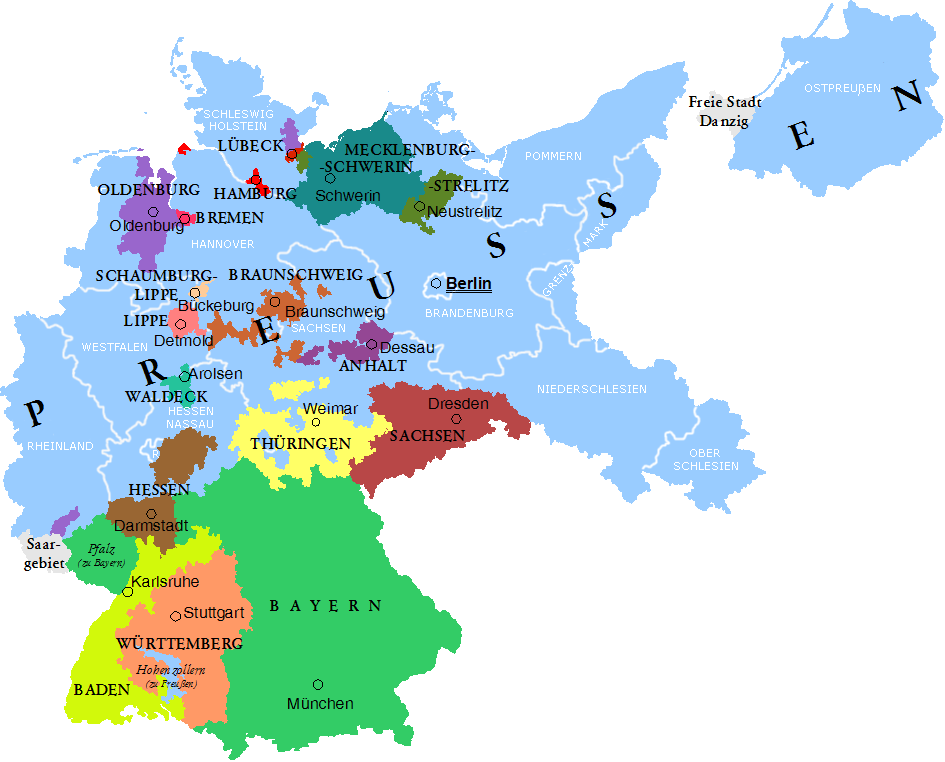
Württemberg in the Weimar Republic (at the bottom left in orange)

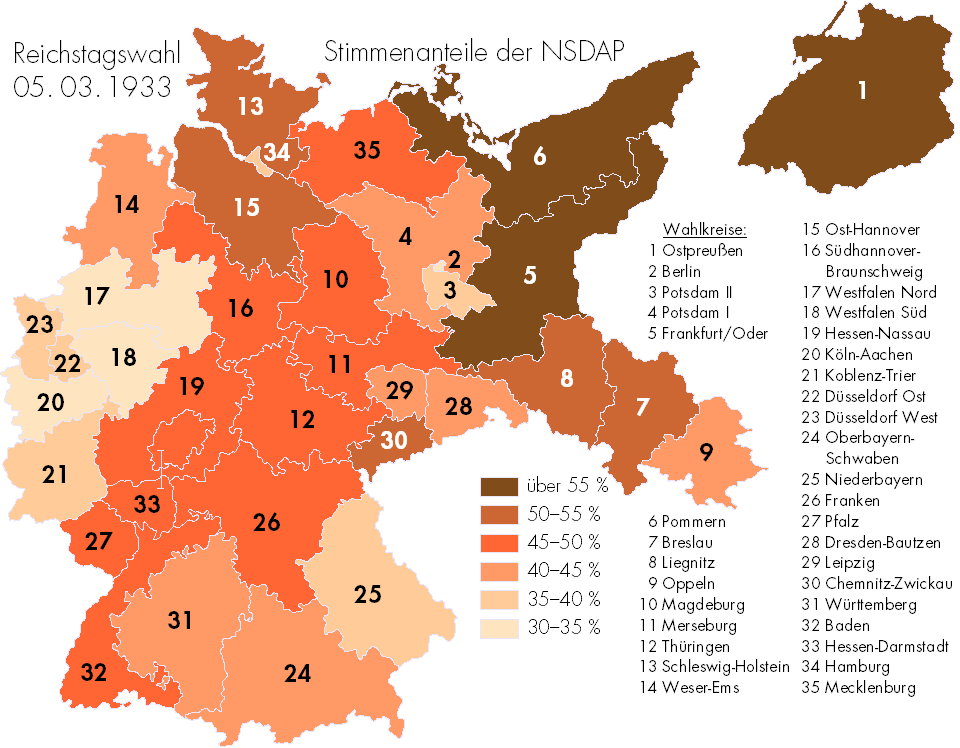
Support for the Nazi Party in the March 1933 Reichstag election. Württemberg is area 31.

Results of Württemberg Landtag elections 1919 to 1932
Party / Date	SPD	DDP	Centre	DNVP / WBP (Note: The Württembergische Bürgerpartei (Württemberg Citizens' Party) was the state branch of the German National People's Party (DNVP).)	WBB (Note: Württembergischer Bauernbund (Württemberg Agrarian League))	USPD	WBWB (Note: Württembergischer Bauern- und Weingärtnerbund (Württemberg Small Farmers' and Winegrowers' League))	DVP	KPD	VSB (Note: Völkisch-sozialer Block (Völkisch-Social Bloc), an electoral alliance of parties of the extreme right and members the Nazi Party, which was banned following Hitler's Beer Hall Putsch of 1923)	CSVD	NSDAP
12 January 1919	34.4 % 52 seats	25.0 % 38 seats	20.8 % 31 seats	7.4 % 11 seats	5.8 % 10 seats	3.1 % 4 seats	2.7 % 4 seats	-	-	-	-	-
6 June 1920	16.1 % 17 seats	14.7 % 15 seats	22.5 % 23 seats	9.3 % 10 seats	17.7 % 18 seats	13.3 % 14 seats	-	3.4 % 4 seats	-	-	-	-
4 May 1924	16.0 % 13 seats	10.6 % 9 seats	20.9 % 17 seats	10.4 % 8 seats	-	-	20.2 % 17 seats	4.6 % 3 seats	11.7 % 10 seats	4.0 % 3 seats	-	-
20 May 1928	23.8 % 22 seats	10.1 % 8 seats	19.6 % 17 seats	5.7 % 4 seats	-	-	18.1 % 16 seats	5.2 % 4 seats	7.4 % 6 seats	-	3.9 % 3 seats	-
24 April 1932	16.6 % 14 seats	4.8 % 4 seats	20.5 % 17 seats	4.3 % 3 seats	-	-	10.7 % 9 seats	-	9.4 % 7 seats	-	4.2 % 3 seats	26.4 % 23 seats

== 1919 ==
The election was held on 12 January 1919 to elect the 150 members of the Württemberg state constituent assembly.

Party	Votes	%	Seats
Social Democratic Party	452,699	34.45	52
German Democratic Party	328,689	25.01	38
Centre Party	273,200	20.79	31
Württemberg Citizens' Party	97,840	7.44	11
Württemberg Agrarian League	76,098	5.79	10
Independent Social Democratic Party	40,634	3.09	4
Württemberg Peasants and Winegrowers' League	35,285	2.68	4
Upper Swabian Farmers' Association	5,755	0.44	0
German Peace Party	4,034	0.31	0
Total	1,314,234	100.00	150
Valid votes	1,314,234	99.79	
Invalid/blank votes	2,817	0.21	
Total votes	1,317,051	100.00	
Registered voters/turnout	1,449,216	90.88	
Source: Schröder, Gonschior

== 1920 ==
The election was held on 6 June 1920 to elect the 101 members of the Landtag of the Free People's State of Württemberg.

Party	Votes	%	Seats	+/–
Centre Party	247,113	22.54	23	–8
Württemberg Peasants and Winegrowers' League	193,671	17.67	18	+14
Social Democratic Party	176,009	16.06	17	–35
German Democratic Party	161,595	14.74	15	–23
Independent Social Democratic Party	145,233	13.25	14	+10
Württemberg Citizens' Party	102,319	9.33	10	–1
German People's Party	37,199	3.39	4	New
Communist Party	33,147	3.02	0	New
Total	1,096,286	100.00	101	–49
Valid votes	1,096,286	96.39		
Invalid/blank votes	41,090	3.61		
Total votes	1,137,376	100.00		
Registered voters/turnout	1,475,196	77.10		
Source: Schröder, Gonschior

== 1924 ==
The election was held on 4 May 1924 to elect the 80 members of the Landtag of the Free People's State of Württemberg.

Party	Votes	%	Seats	+/–
Centre Party	248,748	20.91	17	–6
Württemberg Peasants and Winegrowers' League	240,453	20.21	17	–1
Social Democratic Party	190,285	15.99	13	–4
Communist Party	138,683	11.66	10	+10
German Democratic Party	125,545	10.55	9	–6
Patriotic Nationalist Right-Wing Bloc	124,207	10.44	8	–2
German People's Party	55,096	4.63	3	–1
Völkisch-Social Bloc	47,301	3.98	3	New
Geusen League	15,039	1.26	0	New
Free Economy Union F.F.F.	3,773	0.32	0	New
Rural and People's League	627	0.05	0	New
Total	1,189,757	100.00	80	–21
Valid votes	1,189,757	99.01		
Invalid/blank votes	11,947	0.99		
Total votes	1,201,704	100.00		
Registered voters/turnout	1,533,236	78.38		
Source: Schröder, Gonschior

== 1928 ==
The election was held on 20 May 1928 to elect the 80 members of the Landtag of the Free People's State of Württemberg.

Party	Votes	%	Seats	+/–
Social Democratic Party	267,077	23.82	22	+9
Centre Party	219,846	19.61	17	0
Württemberg Peasants and Winegrowers' League	202,481	18.06	16	–1
German Democratic Party	113,196	10.10	8	–1
Communist Party	82,525	7.36	6	–4
German National People's Party	64,131	5.72	4	–4
German People's Party	57,758	5.15	4	+1
Christian Social People's Service	43,440	3.87	3	New
Reich Party for Civil Rights and Deflation	37,098	3.31	0	New
Nazi Party	20,342	1.81	0	New
Reich Party of the German Middle Class	12,226	1.09	0	New
Christian Social Reich Party	973	0.09	0	New
Total	1,121,093	100.00	80	0
Valid votes	1,121,093	98.49		
Invalid/blank votes	17,145	1.51		
Total votes	1,138,238	100.00		
Registered voters/turnout	1,653,216	68.85		
Source: Schröder, Gonschior

On 6 June 1929, the Württemberg state court declared the provisions of the electoral law on seat distribution unconstitutional, and seats were redistributed as follows:

Party	Seats
Social Democratic Party	21
Centre Party	16
Württemberg Peasants and Winegrowers' League	15
German Democratic Party	8
Communist Party	6
German National People's Party	4
German People's Party	4
Christian Social People's Service	3
Reich Party for Civil Rights and Deflation	2
Nazi Party	1
Total	80

== 1932 ==
The election was held on 24 April 1932 to elect the 80 members of the Landtag of the Free People's State of Württemberg.

Party	Votes	%	Seats	+/–
Nazi Party	328,320	26.38	23	+22
Centre Party	254,680	20.46	17	0
Social Democratic Party	206,574	16.60	14	–8
Württemberg Peasants and Winegrowers' League	133,545	10.73	9	–7
Communist Party	116,652	9.37	7	+1
German Democratic Party	59,677	4.79	4	–4
German National People's Party	53,415	4.29	3	–1
Christian Social People's Service	52,355	4.21	3	0
German People's Party	19,312	1.55	0	–4
People's Justice Party	16,344	1.31	0	0
Free Non-Partisan Voters' Association	3,902	0.31	0	New
Total	1,244,776	100.00	80	0
Valid votes	1,244,776	99.57		
Invalid/blank votes	5,365	0.43		
Total votes	1,250,141	100.00		
Registered voters/turnout	1,775,154	70.42		
Source: Schröder, Gonschior

On 31 March 1933, the Provisional Law on the Coordination of the States with the Reich was enacted, leading to the reallocation of the Landtag seats based on the results of the March 1933 German federal election in Württemberg.

Party	Seats	+/–
Nazi Party	26	+3
Centre Party	10	–7
Social Democratic Party	9	–5
Communist Party	6	–1
Peasants and Winegrowers' League	3	–6
Black-White-Red Struggle Front	3	0
Christian Social People's Service	2	–1
German Democratic Party	1	–3
Total	60	–20
Source: Schröder, Gonschior

== See also ==
- Free People's State of Württemberg
- History of Württemberg
- Weimar Republic
- March 1933 German federal election
