= Eugen Munder =

German Nazi official {1899–1952)

Gauleiter of Gau Württemberg-Hohenzollern
- In office 8 July 1925 – 9 January 1928
- Appointed by: Adolf Hitler
- Preceded by: Position established
- Succeeded by: Wilhelm Murr

Personal details
- Born: 9 October 1899 Stuttgart, Kingdom of Württemberg, German Empire
- Died: 20 November 1952 (aged 53) Stuttgart, West Germany
- Cause of death: Brain tumor
- Party: Nazi Party

Military service
- Allegiance: German Empire
- Branch/service: Imperial German Army
- Years of service: 1917–1919
- Unit: Field Artillery Regiment 13; Field Artillery Regiment No. 116
- Battles/wars: World War I

Eugen Munder (9 October 1899 – 20 November 1952) was an early member of the Nazi Party and Gauleiter of Gau Württemberg-Hohenzollern.

== Early life ==
Munder was born in Stuttgart in 1899. After attending elementary school, he attended military school in Jena and then became an apprentice in the civil service. He was conscripted in 1917, assigned to Field Artillery Regiment 13 in Ulm and participated in World War I. He saw action on the front lines in Field Artillery Regiment No. 116 and in Sturmbataillon 16. Following Germany's defeat, Munder was demobilized in January 1919 and became an activist in the Deutschvölkischer Schutz und Trutzbund, the largest, most active, and most influential antisemitic federation in Germany after the war. He resumed his career in the civil service, working as an actuary and passing written and oral examinations in 1921.

== Nazi Party career ==
By 1921, Munder was already active on behalf of the Nazi Party in Stuttgart. On 15 April 1925, he joined the Party (Membership number 1,835) when the ban on it was lifted. He was a very effective organizer and re-founded the party's Gau headquarters, becoming the local branch leader (Ortsgruppenleiter) in Stuttgart. Adolf Hitler appointed him Gauleiter of Württemberg after a rally in Stuttgart on 8 July 1925. From 1925 to 1928, Munder served as the editor and publisher of a local Nazi newspaper, The Southwest German Observer. In 1927, Munder expressed criticism of Hitler's lifestyle. He also was involved in a major row over the candidate list for upcoming elections to the Württemberg Landtag. When Hitler supported Munder's rival, Christian Mergenthaler, to head the list over him, Munder resigned as Gauleiter on 9 January 1928. His successor was Wilhelm Murr. Munder then was expelled from the NSDAP on 18 January 1928 and thereafter played no active part in politics.

He resumed his career as a civil servant, working largely in the field of health insurance. After the Nazi seizure of power in 1933, Munder reapplied for party membership but was rejected on two occasions. In 1935, he became the head of the General Health Insurance Office in Stuttgart. He finally was readmitted to the Party, effective 1 August 1935. He also joined the Sturmabteilung (SA) around this time. In October 1944, he was recruited as a platoon leader in the Württemberg Volkssturm, rising to battalion leader in January 1945.

== Post-war life ==
After the end of World War II he was arrested and, in April 1948, sentenced to four-and-a-half years in a labor camp by a denazification court. After suffering epileptic seizures, Munder was released from custody in July 1948 on medical grounds and placed on parole. He was found to have a slow growing brain tumor and he died on 20 November 1952.

== Literature ==
- Karl Höffkes: Hitlers Politische Generale. Die Gauleiter des 3. Reiches; ein biographisches Nachschlagewerk. Grabert-Verlag, Tübingen 1997, ISBN 3-87847-163-7.
- Michael D. Miller & Andreas Schulz: Gauleiter: The Regional Leaders of the Nazi Party and Their Deputies, 1925-1945, Volume II (Georg Joel - Dr. Bernhard Rust), R. James Bender Publishing, 2017, ISBN 1-932970-32-0.
- Michael Matthiesen: Munder, Eugen Paul; in: Württembergische Biographien, Band III, Stuttgart 2017, ISBN 978-3-17-033572-1.
