= Eugen Bolz =

German politician and anti-Nazi resistance figure (1881–1945)

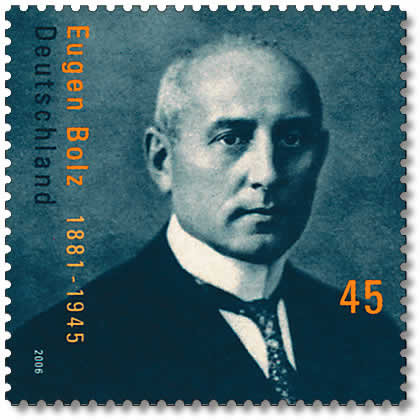

5th State President of Württemberg
- In office 1928–1933
- Preceded by: Wilhelm Bazille
- Succeeded by: Wilhelm Murr

Personal details
- Born: 15 December 1881 Rottenburg am Neckar, Germany
- Died: 23 January 1945 (aged 63) Plötzensee Prison, Berlin, Germany
- Cause of death: Execution by guillotine
- Party: Centre Party
- Spouse: Maria Hoeneß (m. 1920)
- Children: 1

Eugen Anton Bolz (15 December 1881 – 23 January 1945) was a German politician and a member of the resistance to the Germany's Nazi regime. He was executed by guillotine for participating in the 20 July plot which attempted to assassinate Adolf Hitler.

== Background ==
Eugen Anton Bolz was born to Maria Theresia Bolz (née Huber) and salesman Joseph Bolz on 15 December 1881 in Rottenburg am Neckar. Bolz was the twelfth child in the family. In 1920, he married Maria Hoeness, with whom he had one daughter. Through his wife, Bolz was the uncle of Cardinal Paul Augustin Mayer (1911–2010).

== Career ==
Bolz took his Abitur in 1900 at the Karls-Gymnasium in Stuttgart. He was involved in the Windthorstbund, the youth organization of the Centre Party.

From 1900, he studied law at the University of Tübingen and at the universities of Bonn (1901) and Berlin (1901–02). He became a member of the Catholic student associations AV Guestfalia Tübingen, the KDStV Bavaria Bonn and the KAV Suevia Berlin, all in the CV. At the KAV Suevia Berlin he met the centre politician Felix Porsch who caused him to become a politician after graduation. In 1902, he continued his studies in Tübingen and graduated in 1905 from the first state examination. He then completed the traineeship in Rottenburg, Ravensburg and Stuttgart. After Bolz had passed second state examination in 1909, he worked as a laborer at the prosecution of Ulm. From 1911 to 1914, he worked as an assessor at the Stuttgart prosecution. During World War I he served as lieutenant in the Western Front in Alsace. Not long after finishing his studies in Bonn and Berlin, he latched onto politics as a career and joined the Centre Party, which he represented in the Reichstag from 1912 to 1933, and from 1915 to 1933, also in the Württemberg Landtag. In Württemberg, he became Justice Minister in 1919 and Interior Minister in 1923.

At the time when the National Socialists seized power in 1933, Bolz was Württemberg's Staatspräsident – the first Catholic to hold the position in predominantly Protestant Württemberg – and also Interior Minister. Since he was an adherent of Catholic social teaching, which made no secret of its loathing for the Nazis, it was no surprise that Bolz was one of the new régime's greatest opponents. Owing to this, he was forced from office early in 1933 and wound up spending several weeks in Hohenasperg Prison. Led by the party whip, Bolz's party approved the new Ermächtigungsgesetz ("Enabling Act") on 23 March 1933, even though it weighed heavily on their conscience.

After being released from the concentration camp, Bolz moved back to Beuron, near Ulm. There, he forswore politics for a while, busying himself mainly with economic issues, papal social encyclicals, and Catholic Action. During this time of involuntary retirement, he sometimes did work as a tax advisor, and he always knew that the Gestapo were watching him.

In late 1941 and early 1942, he came into contact with the resistance circle about Carl Friedrich Goerdeler. Bolz readily declared that he would like to take over a ministerial post in the new government after Hitler was overthrown. Goerdeler put him down as Culture Minister in the cabinet that he foresaw having to put together. Among other things, this would have meant that Bolz would be taking Goebbels's place.

However, on 20 July 1944, Goerdeler's plan fell apart when Claus von Stauffenberg's attempt to kill Hitler at the Wolf's Lair in East Prussia failed. Bolz was arrested on 12 August 1944, and on 21 December, he was sentenced to death at the German "People's Court" (Volksgerichtshof). He was beheaded at Plötzensee Prison in Berlin on 23 January 1945.

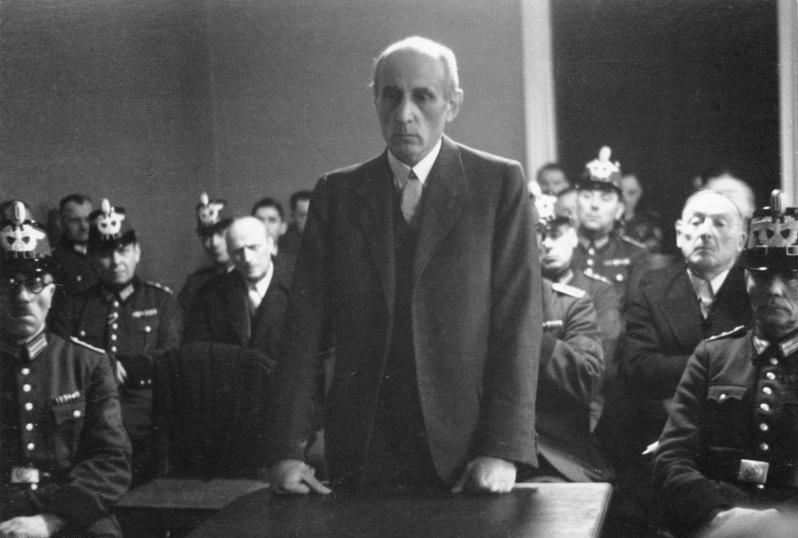
Eugen Bolz at the Volksgerichtshof

A memorial with the inscription "TIMOR DOMINI INITUM SAPIENTIAE" ('The fear of the lord is the beginning of wisdom') was erected to Eugen Bolz at the house where he was born, located at Königstraße 53 in Rottenburg am Neckar. The grammar school that he attended, a Realschule in Ellwangen, a catholic private school in Bad Waldsee as well as sitting rooms in the Baden-Württemberg Landtag were named in his honour. A monument was erected for Bolz in downtown Stuttgart at the Königsbau.

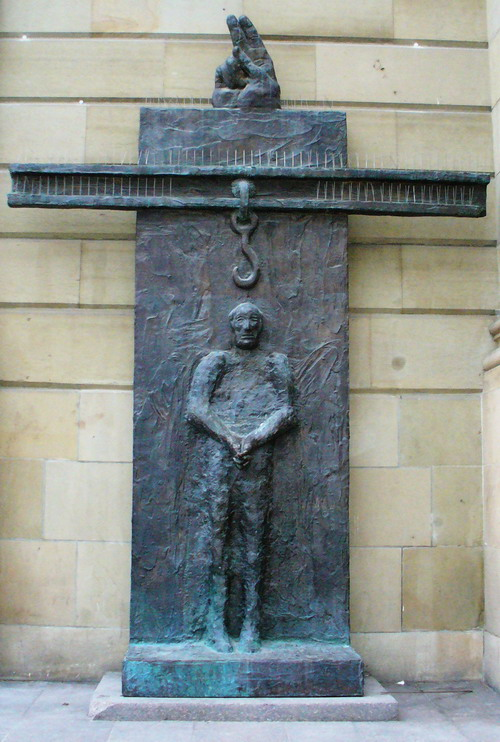
Stuttgart memorial Eugen Bolz

In 2004, a new bell at the church where Bolz was baptized, St. Moriz in Rottenburg am Neckar, was named after him. Many other buildings, streets and squares in Germany are likewise connected with the name Eugen Bolz.

== Eugen Bolz Study Endowment ==
Since 1994, there has been an "Eugen Bolz Study Endowment" (Studienstiftung Eugen Bolz). This endowment is for study and education, and is closely associated with the Cartellverband der katholischen deutschen Studentenverbindungen (CV). It affords students an education in democracy and civics.

== Literature ==
- Christentum und Politik. Dokumente des Widerstands by Joachim Köhler, 1996 Thorbecke-Verlag Sigmaringen, ISBN 3-7995-4083-0
- Eugen Bolz und die Krise des politischen Katholizismus in der Weimarer Republik by Joachim Sailer, bibliotheca academica Verlag, ISBN 3-928471-09-0
- "Eugen Bolz (1881–1945)" by Rudolf Morsey, in: Jürgen Aretz / Anton Rauscher (Hg.), Zeitgeschichte in Lebensbildern, Bd. 5, Mainz 1982
- "Eugen Bolz. Württembergischer Minister und Staatspräsident" by Joachim Köhler, in: Michael Bosch / Wolfgang Niess (Hg.), Der Widerstand im deutschen Südwesten 1933–1945, Stuttgart 1984
- Eugen Bolz by Max Miller, 1951 Schwabenverlag
- Staatspräsident Dr. Eugen Bolz als Mann u. Staatsmann by Alois Dangelmaier, 1948 Schwabenverlag
- Leben und Martyrium unseres Staatspräsidenten Dr. Eugen Bolz by Wilhelm Kohler, 1947 Ackermann Verlag
- Max Miller (1955). "Bolz, Eugen Anton". Neue Deutsche Biographie (in German). Vol. 2. Berlin: Duncker & Humblot. p. 437. (full text online).
- Helmut Moll, (Hrsg. im Auftrag der Deutschen Bischofskonferenz), Zeugen für Chritus. Das deutsche Martyrologium des 20. Jahrhunderts, 6. erweiterte und neu strukturierte Auflage, Paderborn u.a. 2015, ISBN 978-3-506-78080-5, Band I, 659–663.
- Frank Raberg: Eugen Bolz. Zwischen Pflicht und Widerstand. DRW-Verlag Weinbrenner, Leinfelden-Echterdingen 2009, ISBN 3-87181-716-3.
- Joachim Sailer: Eugen Bolz und die Krise des politischen Katholizismus in der Weimarer Republik. bibliotheca academica Verlag, Tübingen 1994, ISBN 3-928471-09-0.
- Ekkart Sauser. "Eugen Bolz". Biographisch-Bibliographisches Kirchenlexikon (BBKL) (in German).
