= Helmut Bazille =

German politician (1920–1973)

Member of the Bundestag; from Baden-Württemberg
- In office 7 September 1949 – 19 October 1969
- Preceded by: Constituency established
- Succeeded by: Erhard Eppler
- Constituency: State list (1949–1961); Heilbronn (1961–1969)

Personal details
- Born: 19 November 1920 Stuttgart, Germany
- Died: 5 May 1973 (aged 52) Bonn, West Germany
- Party: Social Democratic
- Parent: Wilhelm Bazille (father)

Helmut Bazille (19 November 1920 – 5 May 1973) was a German politician of the Social Democratic Party (SPD) and member of the German Bundestag.

== Life ==
His father was German politician Wilhelm Bazille. Bazille was a member of the German Bundestag from the first Bundestag elections in 1949 to 1969, and since the 1961 Bundestag elections with a direct mandate in the Heilbronn constituency.

== Literature ==
Herbst, Ludolf; Jahn, Bruno (2002). Vierhaus, Rudolf (ed.). Biographisches Handbuch der Mitglieder des Deutschen Bundestages. 1949–2002 [Biographical Handbook of the Members of the German Bundestag. 1949–2002] (in German). München: De Gruyter - De Gruyter Saur. p. 1715. ISBN 978-3-11-184511-1.
