= Le déjeuner sur l'herbe: les trois femmes noires =

2010 painting by Mickalene Thomas

Le déjeuner sur l'herbe: les trois femmes noires is a massive painting created by the African-American visual artist Mickalene Thomas. The painting is both a critique of and reference to Édouard Manet's 1863 painting Le Déjeuner sur l'herbe. Thomas' piece portrays three bold, black women adorned with rich colors, patterned clothing, and radiant Afro-styled hair; the women's positioning and posing is reminiscent of the subjects of Manet's piece, but the gazes of all three women are fixed on the viewer. Thomas created the painting, her largest piece at the time, in 2010 after being commissioned by the Museum of Modern Art (MoMA) in New York City to create a display piece for 53rd street window of the museum's restaurant The Modern.

== Description ==
Thomas' Le déjeuner sur l'herbe: Les Trois Femmes Noires was created in three stages. First, Thomas photographed three models in the sculpture garden of the MoMA. Thomas stated that she chose the sculpture garden within the museum to be the setting of her photograph and subsequent related pieces because she wanted to create a "site-specific" piece of art for the commission. Thomas then created a collage using the photograph as a base material and added other elements. This collage now hangs in the lobby of the P.S.1, an extension of the MoMA in Queens that houses unconventional contemporary artwork. Finally, the painting was created based on the photograph but composed of collage-like painted segments on wood panels and rendered in acrylic, oil, enamel, and rhinestones. The painting, which stands 10 feet tall and extends 24 feet wide, deliberately takes up a large amount of space literally and figuratively, as the piece's size enables it to demand recognition in spaces traditionally dominated by white male artists. The original installation of the painting was in the window of The Modern, MoMA's restaurant. While there, the piece was visible throughout the day to passersby on the street; this accessibility made Le déjeuner sur l'herbe: Les Trois Femmes Noires Thomas' most public piece yet.

The subjects of the painting are three dazzling, richly dressed women of color. The models who are the subjects of the original Le déjeuner sur l'herbe: Les Trois Femmes Noires photograph are all friends of Thomas which is common across many of the artist's photographs. All three women are fully clothed– compared to the nude female subjects in Manet's version of the scene– in richly patterned dresses that Thomas herself designed, and they sit upon fabrics staged by the artists. An array of vintage patterns are juxtaposed throughout the work, which, Thomas claims, serves to represent the "amalgamation of all of the different things we are as Americans." Behind the women in both the photograph and the painting sits a Matisse sculpture that was situated behind the women in the sculpture garden.

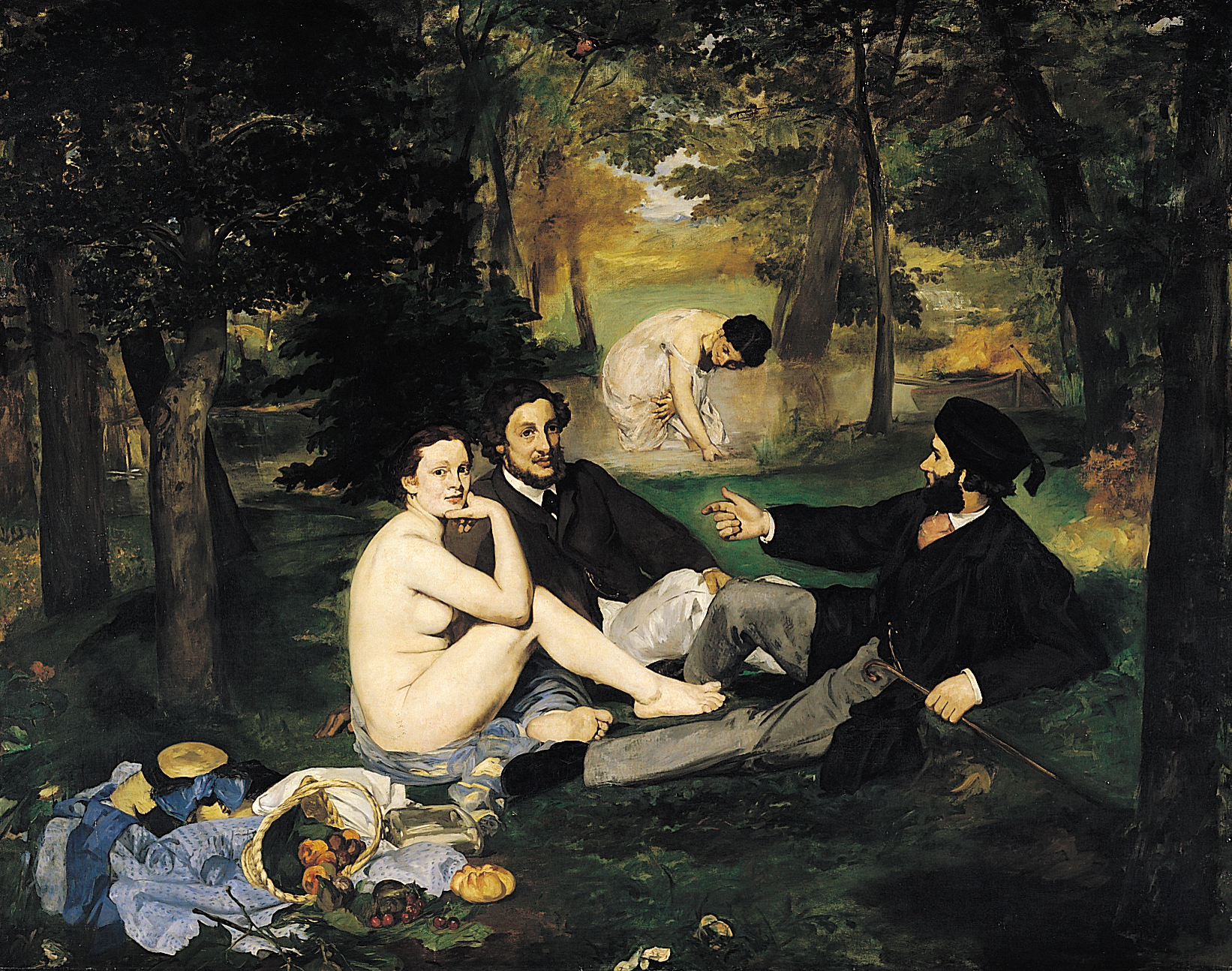
Manet, Edouard - Le Déjeuner sur l'Herbe (1863)

== Influences ==
Thomas' Le déjeuner sur l'herbe: Les Trois Femmes Noires is unmistakably based on Édouard Manet's 1863 painting Le Déjeuner sur l'herbe. Manet's piece, which caused extraordinary controversy at the time of its creation, exhibits two undressed women who are sitting comfortably with two formally dressed men at a picnic. While one of the nude women is crouched in the background, the three other subjects lounge in the foreground. The female subject in the foreground is looking out, meeting the gaze of the viewer. In Thomas' version of the painting, the three subjects in the foreground are all women of color who are fully clothed in colorful dresses with patterns reminiscent of the 1970s, and all three of the women's gazes confront the viewer. The woman in the background of Manet's scene is represented in Thomas' piece by a Matisse sculpture in front of which she positioned the models in the photograph taken in the MoMA sculpture garden. (Thomas often alludes to Matisse in her work.) In addition to these explicit allusions, the painting, along with many of Thomas' other pieces, is inspired by Dada, cubism, and the Harlem Renaissance.

== Response ==
The majority of critical responses to Le déjeuner sur l'herbe: Les Trois Femmes Noires primarily address the piece's impact on the post-black and post-feminist movements. Post-blackness refers to the complex ideological movement of many contemporary African American artists frustrated with the prevailing notions of black identity politics which are seen as exclusionary and diminutive. A primary tenet of post-blackness is a rejection of the heteronormative and patriarchal values of prevailing black identity politics– particularly the images put forth by the civil rights and Black Power movements– and this painting has been considered a paragon of this ethos. One of the primary ways it demonstrates these values is by the powerful way in which the viewer is confronted by the three subjects' gazes. Seattle Art Museum curator Catharina Manchanda remarked, "these women are so grounded and perfectly comfortable in their own space... While we might be looking at them, they are also sizing us up." Thomas has addressed this component of her work, saying that her intention was to direct the women's eyes boldly towards the viewer was to ensure a sense of "recognition and acknowledgement and validation" between the viewer and the subject and demonstrate how "the sitters are aware of their empowerment but also of the viewer's response to it."

Thomas is known for her masterful use of unconventional materials. MoMA curator Klaus Biesenbach, who originally commissioned the painting, explained that he requested Thomas largely because "her treatment of surfaces as complex layers of material, lacquer, rhinestone and paint corresponds with the libidinous nature of the contents she depicts."

Some critics and viewers have alleged that the nature of the painting– sensual women being exhibited for an audience– serves to exploit the women represented in the piece. The majority of critics, however, see the painting as an active challenge to such exploitation and Blaxploitation.

Since the original installment of this painting wherein the piece was exhibited as an individual item, Le déjeuner sur l'herbe: Les Trois Femmes Noires has been included in exhibits at the Art Gallery of Ontario, the Seattle Art Museum, and the Baltimore Museum of Art. The reception of the piece when displayed as a portion of a larger exhibit is largely positive, and the piece is often described as a work that sparks timely conversation regarding blackness, representation, sexuality, and identity.
