= Wilhelm Bazille =

German lawyer and politician

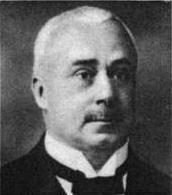
- Bazille Wilhelm in 1928
- Born: February 25, 1874
- Died: February 1, 1934 (aged 59); Stuttgart
- Occupations: Lawyer, politician

Wilhelm Bazille (German pronunciation: ['vɪlhɛlm ba.ziː]) (born February 25, 1874, in Esslingen am Neckar; died February 1, 1934, in Stuttgart) was a German lawyer and politician (DNVP).

== Life ==
Wilhelm Bazille was the son of Peter Franz Bazille (1839–1917). Peter Franz Bazille came from Savoy and was a skilled metal worker. His mother was Anna Amalia Rieb (1843–1921). He grew up in Geislingen, where his father was a metal master at the WMF Group. Bazille passed in 1892 abitur in Ulm, then he studied law and political science in Tübingen and Munich. During his studies he became a member of the Studentenverbindung A.V. Virtembergia to Tübingen .

For health reasons, Bazille was exempted from military service. In 1899, he became a bailiff in Bad Mergentheim in the civil service and moved in 1900 to Stuttgart, where he worked from 1911 as a senior civil servant at the Landesgewerbeamt. During First World War he was from 1914 to 1918 president of the civil administration in the occupied Limburg.

Bazille initially joined the young liberals and founded in 1919 the Württembergische Bürgerpartei, which was from 1920 the Württemberg affiliate of the DNVP, the main German conservative party under the Weimar Republic. He was from 1919 to 1932 a member of the Württemberg State Parliament and from 1920 to 1930 also a member of the Reichstag. From 1930 to 1932 he was an attached member.

On June 3, 1924, Bazille was elected as the successor of Edmund Rau for president of Württemberg and formed a coalition of Staatspartei, Bauernbund and Zentrum. Because of the high electoral defeat of the party in the regional elections on May 20, 1928, Bazille gave the office of the president on June 8, 1928, to his coalition partner Eugen Bolz of the center. Bazille remained until the end of government Bolz on March 11, 1933, Württemberg cult minister . Due to inner-party opposition to Alfred Hugenberg he left 1930 the Württembergische Bürgerpartei. He committed suicide on February 1, 1934. His grave is located at the Stuttgart Pragfriedhof.

Bazille married in 1912 Lilly Ensinger (1884–1976), they had three children. His son Helmut Bazille belonged from 1949 to 1969 for the SPD to the German Bundestag.

== Literature ==
- Müller, Hans Peter: Wilhelm Bazille. Deutschnationaler Politiker, württembergischer Staatspräsident (1874–1934). In: Lebensbilder aus Baden-Württemberg. Band 21. Verlag W. Kohlhammer, Stuttgart 2005
- Müller, Hans Peter: Wilhelm Bazille. In: Württembergische Biographien. Band 2. W. Kohlhammer, Stuttgart 2011
- Deutscher Wirtschaftsverlag, AG (Hrsg.): Reichshandbuch der Deutschen Gesellschaft. Band 1, Berlin 1931
