= Milch =

Milch is the German word for milk, and an old English word for a milk-producing cow.

It is also a surname derived from the German word, originally used as an occupational surname for people working as milk dealers or in dairy farming.

== Notable people with the name ==
- Al Milch (1919–2010), American football coach
- Ella Milch-Sheriff (born 1954), Israeli composer
- David Milch (born 1945), American television writer and producer
- Erhard Milch (1892–1972), German commander of the Luftwaffe during World War II
- Jacob Milch (1866–1945), Polish-American writer and chocolate manufacturer
- Klara Milch (1891–1970), Austrian swimmer and Olympic medallist
- Olivia Milch, American television writer and director
- Werner Milch (1903–1984), German lawyer and soldier

== See also ==
- Milch Trial
