= Flick trial =

1947 war crimes trial against German industrialist Friedrich Flick

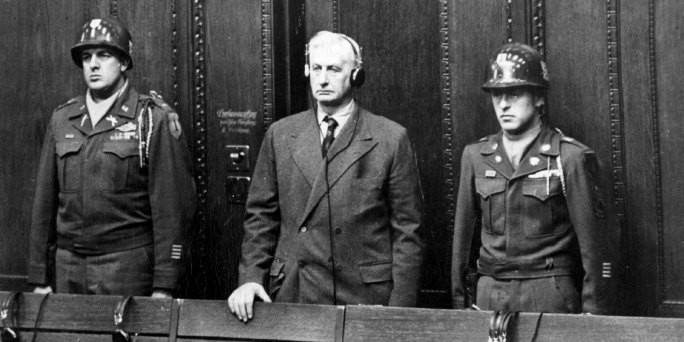
Friedrich Flick receives his sentence in the Flick Trial.

The United States of America vs. Friedrich Flick, et al. or Flick trial was the fifth of twelve Nazi war crimes trials held by United States authorities in their occupation zone in Germany (Nuremberg) after World War II. It was the first of three trials of leading industrialists of Nazi Germany; the two others were the IG Farben Trial and the Krupp Trial.

These trials were all held before American military tribunals. The Flick trial was one of the 12 Subsequent Nuremberg Trials of the military, political, and economic leadership of Nazi Germany, held after the Nuremberg Trials (the "Trial of the Major War Criminals before the International Military Tribunal"), the most well-known trial which tried 22 of the most important captured Nazis. Like the other trials, the Flick trial took place at the Palace of Justice.

The defendants in this case were Friedrich Flick and five other high-ranking directors of Flick's group of companies, Flick Kommanditgesellschaft, or Flick KG. The charges centered on slave labor and plundering, but Flick and the most senior director, Otto Steinbrinck, were also charged for their membership in the "Circle of Friends of Himmler." The circle was a group of influential German industrialists and bankers—founded in 1932 by Wilhelm Keppler and taken over by Himmler in 1935—for the purpose of giving financial support to the Nazis. Its members "donated" annually about 1 million Reichsmark to a "Special Account S" in favor of Heinrich Himmler.

The judges in this case, heard before Military Tribunal IV, were Charles B. Sears (presiding judge), former Chief Judge of the New York Court of Appeals; William C. Christianson, former Minnesota Supreme Court justice; Frank Richman, former Indiana Supreme Court justice; and Richard D. Dixon, former North Carolina Superior Court judge, as an alternate judge.

The Chief of Counsel for the Prosecution was Telford Taylor, and the lead Prosecutor in this case was Joseph M. Stone, Esq., a labor lawyer on leave from the U.S. Department of Labor in Washington, D.C. The indictment was filed on February 8 and amended on March 18, 1947; the trial lasted from April 19 to December 22, 1947. Friedrich Flick was sentenced to seven years of imprisonment, two of the other defendants received shorter sentences, and the remaining three were acquitted.

== Indictment ==
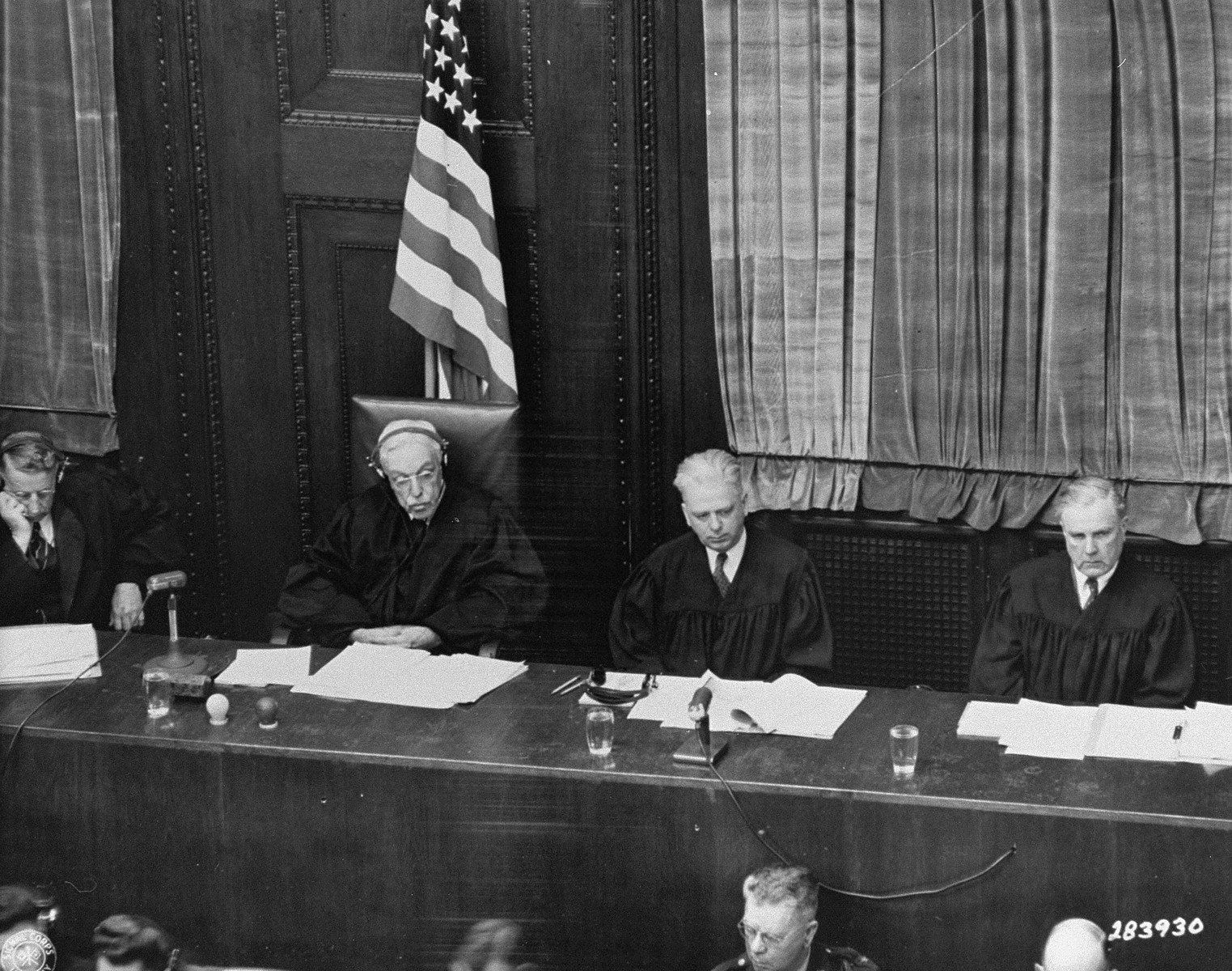
Flick Trial judges (Military Tribunal IV)

1. War crimes and crimes against humanity by participating in the deportation and enslavement of the civilian populations of countries and territories under the belligerent occupation of or otherwise controlled by Germany, and of concentration camp inmates, for use in slave labor in Flick mines and factories.
2. War crimes and crimes against humanity through the plundering and spoliation of occupied territories, and the seizure of plants both in the west (France) and the east (Poland, Russia).
3. Crimes against humanity through participation in the persecution of Jews and the "aryanization" of their properties.
4. Membership in the NSDAP and the "Circle of Friends of Himmler".
5. Membership in a criminal organization, the SS.

Count 2 excluded Terberger, count 3 applied to Flick, Steinbrinck, and Kaletsch, count 4 to Flick and Steinbrinck, while count 5 applied only to Steinbrinck, who had been an SS Brigadeführer. The SS had been declared a criminal organization previously by the IMT.

All defendants pleaded "not guilty".

The court dismissed count 3, stating that the evidence presented (which was all for cases prior to September 1939) fell outside its jurisdiction as the tribunal had a mandate only for acts committed during World War II, i.e., from September 1939 to May 1945.

== Defendants ==
Photo	Name	Charges					Sentence
		1	2	3	4	5	
	Friedrich Flick	G	G	I	G		7 years, incl. time already served. Died on 20 July 1972.
	Otto Steinbrinck	I	I	I	G	G	5 years, incl. time already served. Died in prison on 16 August 1949.
	Bernhard Weiss	G	I				2.5 years, released from prison in 1949. Died in 1973.
	Odilo Burkart	I	I				Acquitted
	Konrad Kaletsch	I	I	I			Acquitted
	Hermann Terberger	I					Acquitted

I — Indicted G — Indicted and found guilty
