= The Memory of Justice =

1976 documentary film directed by Marcel Ophuls

- Directed by: Marcel Ophuls
- Produced by: Ana Carrigan; Hamilton Fish V; Sanford Lieberson; Max Palevsky; David Puttnam
- Cinematography: Michael J. Davis
- Edited by: Inge Behrens
- Distributed by: Paramount Pictures
- Release date: 4 October 1976
- Running time: 278 minutes
- Countries: France; West Germany; United Kingdom; United States
- Language: French

The Memory of Justice is a 1976 documentary film directed by Marcel Ophuls. It explores the subject of atrocities committed in wartime and features Joan Baez, Karl Dönitz, Hans-Joachim Kulenkampff, Yehudi Menuhin, Albert Speer and Telford Taylor.

The film was inspired by Telford Taylor's 1970 book Nuremberg and Vietnam: An American Tragedy, and Taylor is interviewed extensively during the film. But Ophuls takes the book as a starting point for exploring the possibility of people judging one another, especially in light of their behavior in other contexts, as well as dealing with individual versus collective responsibility. The film discusses the notion that any group in power is capable of committing a war atrocity.

The film had a difficult genesis. It was originally financed in the summer of 1973 by the BBC, Polytel, and a private company based in London, Visual Programme Systems (VPS), the latter of whom had wanted the film to dwell heavily on America's involvement in Vietnam and France's involvement in Algeria. The BBC and Polytel had invested on the basis of a three hour film however, after completing rough cuts, VPS was dismayed at Ophuls' work which ran to more than four hours (particularly his excessive leaning on the Nuremberg Trials and Nazi involvement) and tried to remove him as director. Hamilton Fish V organized a group of investors who were able to buy back the rights to the film from VPS and allow Ophuls to complete it.

The film was screened at the 1976 Cannes Film Festival, but wasn't entered into the main competition.

The Memory of Justice was restored by the Academy Film Archive in 2015. This restored version was screened at the Toronto International Film Festival in September 2015, and at the BFI London Film Festival in October 2015.

In 2017, Ophuls referred to the film as "the most personal and sincere work I've ever done."

== Cast ==
- Yehudi Menuhin
- Noël Favrelière
- Colonel Anthony Herbert
- Eddie Sowder
- Telford Taylor
- Marie-Claude Vaillant-Couturier
- Robert Kempner
- Dr. G. M. Gilbert
- Karl Dönitz
- Albert Speer
- Daniel Ellsberg
- Beate Klarsfeld
- Serge Klarsfeld
- Hartley Shawcross
- Hans-Joachim Kulenkampff
- Johanna Hofer
- Walter Warlimont
- Ben Ferencz
- Edgar Faure
- Robert Jay Lifton
- Betty Jean Lifton
- Margarete Mitscherlich-Nielsen
- Alexander Mitscherlich
- Hans Kehrl
- John Kenneth Galbraith
- Howard Levy
- Henri Alleg
- Jacques Pâris de Bollardière
- Georges Casalis
- Eugen Kogon
- Gerhard Rose
- Otto Kranzbühler
- E.J.B. Rose
- Richard A. Falk
- Tod Ensign

== Archival footage ==
- Geoffrey Lawrence
- Phan Thi Kim Phuc
- Robert H. Jackson
- Sidney Alderman
- Hermann Göring
- Rudolf Hess
- Joachim von Ribbentrop
- Sir David Maxwell-Fyfe
- Karl-Heinz Moehle
- Adolf Hitler

== Reception ==
On review aggregator website Rotten Tomatoes, the film holds an approval rating of 60% based on 5 reviews, with an average rating of 5.0/10.
