= Wilhelm Ritter von Leeb =

German field marshal (1876–1956)

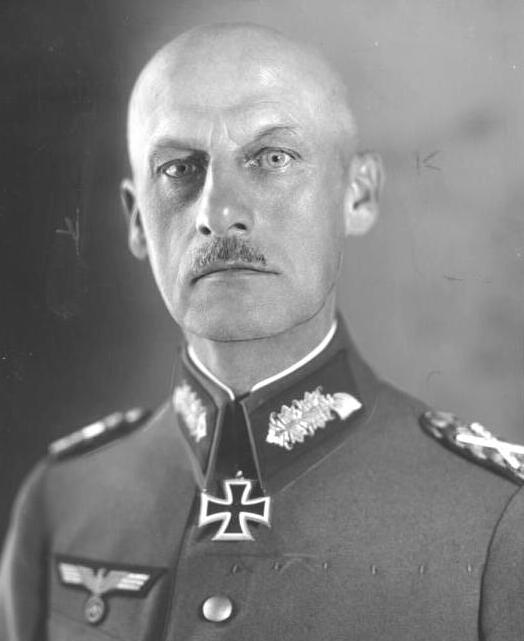
- Leeb in 1940
- Born: Wilhelm Josef Franz Leeb; 5 September 1876; Landsberg am Lech, Bavaria, Germany
- Died: 29 April 1956 (aged 79); Füssen, Bavaria, West Germany
- Relatives: Emil Leeb (brother)
- Military career
- Allegiance: Germany
- Branch: Bavarian Army; Reichswehr; German Army
- Service years: 1895–1945
- Rank: Generalfeldmarschall
- Commands: 12th Army; Army Group C; Army Group North
- Conflicts: Boxer Rebellion; First World War; Second World War; Occupation of Czechoslovakia; Invasion of Poland; Battle of France; Operation Barbarossa; Baltic Operation; Advance on Leningrad; Siege of Leningrad
- Awards: Military Order of Max Joseph; Knight's Cross of the Iron Cross
- Criminal information
- Conviction: Crimes against humanity
- Trial: High Command trial
- Penalty: 3 years

Signature
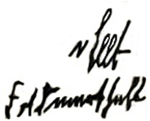

Wilhelm Josef Franz Ritter von Leeb (5 September 1876 – 29 April 1956) was a German Generalfeldmarschall ('Field Marshal') of the Wehrmacht during the Second World War, who was subsequently convicted of war crimes. Leeb was a highly decorated officer in World War I and was awarded the Military Order of Max Joseph which granted him the title of nobility. During the Battle of France, he commanded Army Group C, responsible for the breakthrough of the Maginot Line.

During Operation Barbarossa – the invasion of the Soviet Union – Leeb commanded Army Group North, which advanced through the Baltic States towards Leningrad (present day St. Petersburg), eventually laying siege to the city. Units under Leeb's command committed war crimes against the civilian population and closely cooperated with the SS Einsatzgruppen, death squads primarily tasked with the murder of the Jewish population as part of the Holocaust.

Leeb was a beneficiary of Adolf Hitler's bribery scheme for senior Wehrmacht officers, receiving secret, extra-legal gifts of 250,000 ℛ︁ℳ︁ in 1941, equivalent to €1.07 million in 2021, and of an estate valued at 638,000 ℛ︁ℳ︁ in 1943, equivalent to €3 million in 2021. Following the war, Leeb was tried in the High Command Trial as part of the Subsequent Nuremberg Trials. He was convicted of transmitting the Barbarossa Decree and its criminal application by subordinate units and sentenced to three years' imprisonment time served and was therefore released after the trial concluded.

== Early life ==
Leeb was born in 1876 in Landsberg am Lech as Wilhelm Josef Franz Leeb into a Roman Catholic family. Wilhelm joined the Bavarian Army in 1895 and served in China during the Boxer Rebellion. Between 1907 and 1913, he attended the Bavarian War Academy and served on the General Staff.

== World War I and interwar period ==
At the outbreak of World War I, Leeb rejoined the Bavarian Army. He served on the Eastern Front, where he distinguished himself in the Gorlice–Tarnów Offensive, the capture of the fortress Przemyśl and the campaign in Serbia. In 1915, he was awarded the Military Order of Max Joseph, the receipt of which conferred a title of nobility. Leeb's surname changed to "Ritter von Leeb".

After the war, Leeb remained in the Reichswehr, the army of the Weimar Republic. Before the rise of Adolf Hitler to power, Leeb commanded the military district covering Bavaria. In July 1938, Leeb was given command of the 12th Army, which took part in the occupation of the Sudetenland.

== World War II ==
At the start of World War II, the 63-year-old Ritter von Leeb was the second-oldest general, after Gerd von Rundstedt, who was 64. In the summer of 1939, Leeb was given command of Army Group C and promoted to Generaloberst on 1 November 1939. He opposed the plans for the Battle of France and the 1940 offensive through the neutral Low Countries, and wrote, "The whole world will turn against Germany, which for the second time within 25 years assaults neutral Belgium! Germany, whose government solemnly vouched for and promised the preservation of and respect for this neutrality only a few weeks ago". During the battle, his troops broke through the Maginot Line. Leeb was promoted to the rank of Generalfeldmarschall during the 1940 Field Marshal Ceremony and was awarded the Knight's Cross of the Iron Cross.

=== Invasion of the Soviet Union ===
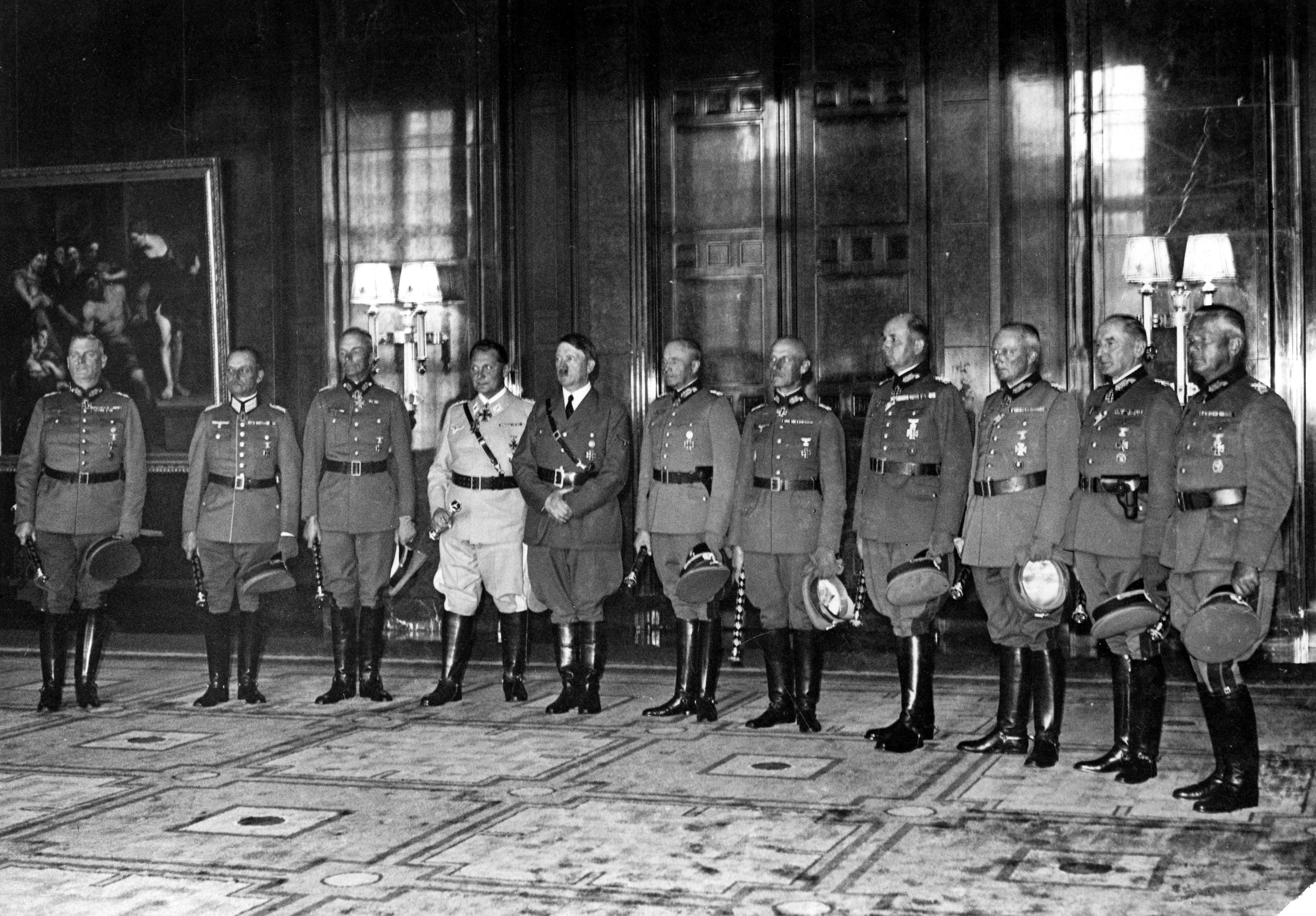
The 1940 Field Marshal Ceremony

During Operation Barbarossa, the invasion of the Soviet Union, Leeb was given command of Army Group North to invade the Baltic states and to capture Leningrad. Leeb was one of more than 200 senior officers who on 30 March 1941 attended a speech in which Hitler laid out his plans for an ideological war of annihilation (Vernichtungskrieg) against the Soviet Union.

==== Baltic states ====
In June 1941, Army Group North, composed of Panzer Group 4, the 16th Army and the 18th Army, overwhelmed Soviet border defences and in the Baltic Operation rapidly advanced through the Baltic states by capturing Kaunas and Riga by 1 July. Leeb had jurisdiction over the area of military operations and over the Army Group North Rear Area. In late June and early July 1941, Franz von Roques, the Rear Area commander, informed Leeb of the massacres of Jews by Einsatzgruppe A, Lithuanian auxiliaries and the men of the 16th Army outside Kaunas. Leeb noted in his diary afterwards that all he could do was to "keep one's distance" and that both men agreed it might be "more humane" to sterilise the Jewish men. Leeb approved of the killing of Jewish men and claimed their crimes during the Soviet occupation of Lithuania justified it but that the killing of women and children might have been excessive.

In early July, General Rudolf Schmundt, Hitler's aide responsible for the disbursing secret extra-legal payments from the Konto 5 fund, visited the headquarters of Army Group North. He told Leeb's staff that the pogroms against and the murder of the Jews by Einsatzgruppe A were a "necessary cleaning up operation" and that "soldiers should not concern themselves with political matters". Leeb received 250,000 ℛ︁ℳ︁, equivalent to €1 million in 2021, from the fund in September 1941 for his birthday. The same month, Franz Walter Stahlecker, the commander of Einsatzgruppe A, in a report to Berlin praised Army Group North for its exemplary co-operation with his men in murdering Jews in the Baltic states.

==== Advance on Leningrad ====
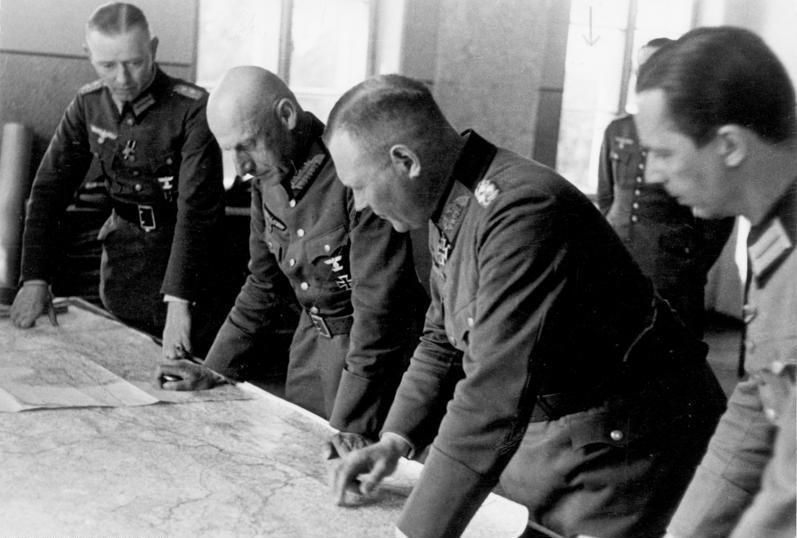
Leeb with Erich Hoepner in September 1941

Soviet resistance stiffened significantly as the army group crossed the Latvian–Russian border in early July 1941. At the same time, Oberkommando des Heeres (OKH, German Army High Command) ordered that Panzer Group 3 was no longer to support Army Group North and was to focus solely on Army Group Centre, leaving Leeb to pursue his objectives, Novgorod, Pskov and Luga, as well as Estonia, without the support of an additional Panzer group. Leeb did not protest, presumably because he believed in the superiority of the German forces and that resistance by the Red Army would not affect his operations. In contrast to those expectations, the marshy terrain around Lake Ilmen and fierce Red Army counterattacks prevented a quick advance.

By early August, Army Group North was seriously overextended, having advanced on a widening front and dispersed its forces on several axes of advance. Leeb estimated that he needed 35 divisions for all of his tasks, but he only had 26. The attack resumed on 10 August but immediately encountered strong opposition around Luga. Leeb's forces were able to take Kingisepp and Narva on 17 August. The army group reached Chudovo on 20 August, severing the rail link between Leningrad and Moscow. Tallinn fell on 28 August. Units under Leeb's command engaged in widespread plunder of foodstuffs as they advanced. Excessive looting prompted Leeb to issue orders in an attempt to limit looting and destruction of property because they would impede the exploitation of the conquered lands. Leeb's order of 16 August 1941 stated that "the start-up work of the economic authorities is being rendered impossible by the senseless 'organisations' of the troops".

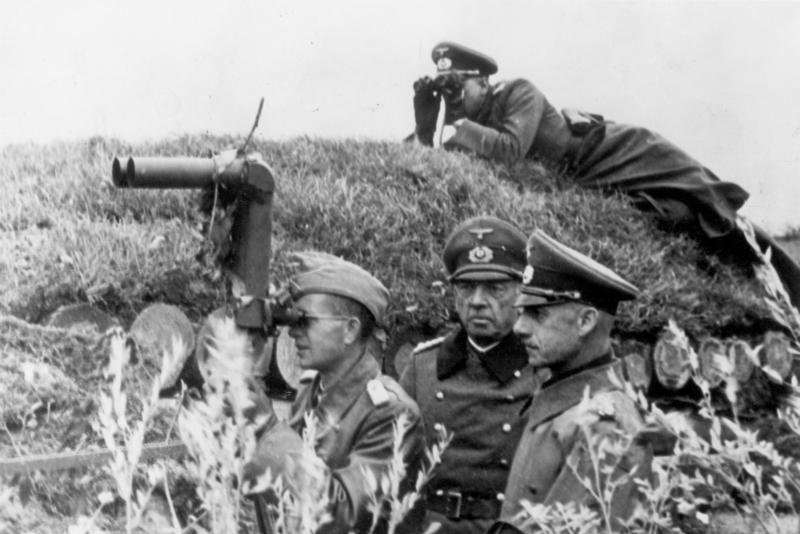
Leeb and Georg von Küchler at an observation post, 11 October 1941

The last rail connection to Leningrad was cut on 30 August, when the German forces reached the River Neva. In early September, Leeb was confident Leningrad was about to fall. Having received reports on the evacuation of civilians and industrial goods, Leeb and OKH believed the Red Army was preparing to abandon the city. On 5 September, he received new orders, including the destruction of the Red Army forces around the city. By 15 September, Panzer Group 4 was to be transferred to Army Group Centre to participate in a renewed offensive towards Moscow. The expected surrender did not materialise although the renewed German offensive cut off the city by 8 September. Lacking sufficient strength for major operations, Leeb had to accept the army group might not be able to take the city but hard fighting continued along his front throughout October and November.

Since September, the headquarters of the army group and OKH had pondered the fate of the city and what to do with the starving Soviet population. Leeb ordered the artillery to fire at any civilians trying to escape from the encircled city to kill them out of view of the frontline infantry. In mid-November, the army group's war diary noted the artillery was preventing civilians from approaching the German lines. The operations led the command to ponder whether the shooting of unarmed civilians would lead to the "loss of inner balance". Senior officers were also concerned about "false" compassion that might affect the fighting qualities of their men. Forces under Leeb's command killed Romani people, handed others over to the units of the Sicherheitsdienst (SD) and participated in the killing of mentally disabled people. In December 1941, with the consent of 18th Army commander Georg von Küchler, SD personnel shot 240 patients in a psychiatric facility.

=== Relieved of command ===
On 15 December 1941, in the midst of the crisis of the Battle of Moscow, Leeb pulled back his forces on the northern wing to a line behind the Volkhov River without permission from OKH. Leeb gained approval for the measure the following day in a personal meeting with Hitler in the Wolfsschanze. On 15 January 1942, Leeb asked Hitler to give him freedom of action or to relieve him of his command. Hitler chose the latter and Küchler assumed command of Army Group North. Hitler never employed Leeb again but Hitler's gratitude lasted until he killed himself in April 1945. After Leeb joined the Führerreserve in 1942, Leeb turned to Hans Heinrich Lammers and indicated that in addition to his estate at Solln on the outskirts of Munich, he wanted an estate in the countryside. Hitler promptly presented him with one at Seestetten, near Passau. According to Gauleiter ('regional Nazi Party leader') Paul Giesler, it was worth an estimated minimum of 660,000 ℛ︁ℳ︁, equivalent to €3 million in 2021.

== Trial and conviction ==
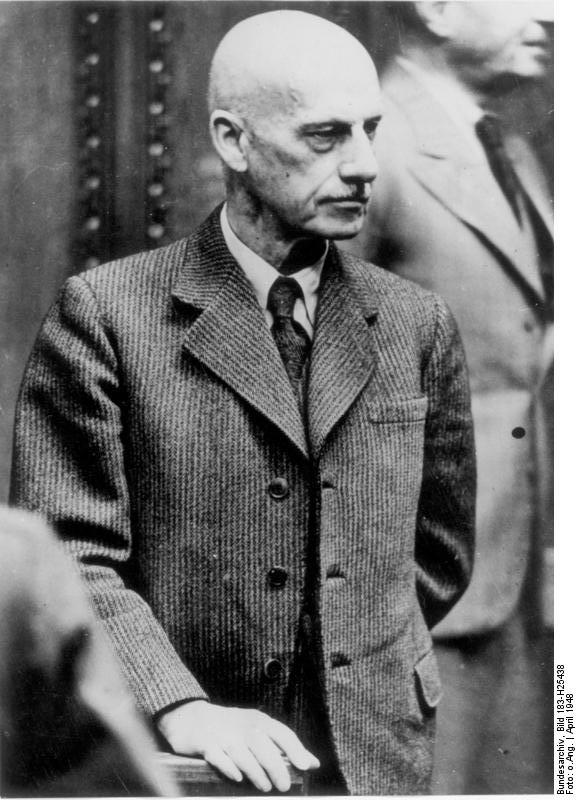
Leeb during the High Command Trial

Leeb was tried by the United States military tribunal in Nuremberg in the High Command Trial. Leeb's defence attorney Hans Laternser acted as the de facto lead defence counsel and often represented other parties in matters of procedure. He defended the "decency" of the German officer corps and asserted that it had displayed respect for the laws of war. The defence attributed the actions of the German military against civilians, hostages and partisans to battle conditions and military necessity. Addressing the criminal orders that Leeb and other defendants had passed on, Laternser claimed that Leeb was a humane soldier who had neither seen nor transmitted such orders and had no opportunity to countermand them. He claimed that Leeb knew nothing of the activities of the Einsatzgruppen in his area of command and anyway had no jurisdiction to stop them.

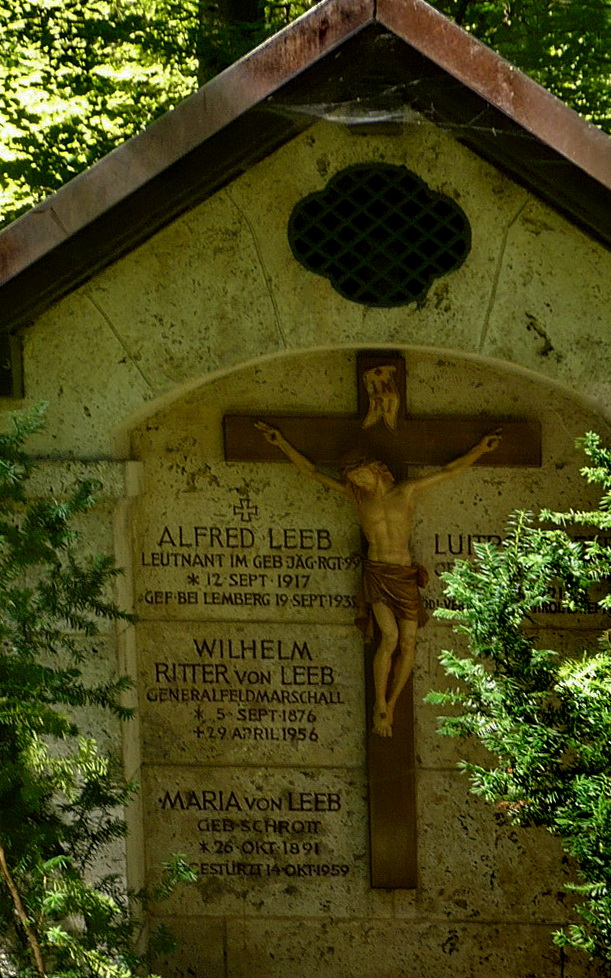
Leeb's grave at the Sollner Waldfriedhof.

As the most senior officer of those on trial, Leeb presented a closing statement on behalf of the defendants. He stated the accused never compromised their soldierly principles and presented them as victims of history: "No soldier in all the world has ever yet had to fight under such a load and tragedy". His statement foreshadowed the narrative of victimisation prevalent in West Germany in the 1950s and the 1960s. Leeb was found guilty on one of four charges; he was convicted of transmitting the Barbarossa Decree and its criminal application by subordinate units. He was sentenced to time served and was released after trial. The sentence was lighter than those of other convicted defendants. The judgement stated, "No criminal order has been introduced [into evidence] that bears his signature or stamp of his approval". After Leeb was released, he returned to his estate in Hohenschwangau, Bavaria. He died of a heart attack in 1956 in Füssen and was buried in the Solln Waldfriedhof.

Military offices
Preceded by General der Infanterie Adolf Ritter von Ruith	Commander of 7th Division; 1 February 1930 – 1 October 1933	Succeeded by none
Preceded by Generalfeldmarschall Fedor von Bock	Commander of Army Group North; 20 June 1941 – 17 January 1942	Succeeded by Generalfeldmarschall Georg von Küchler
