= Rudolf Lehmann =

Rudolf Lehmann may refer to:

- Rudolf Lehmann (artist) (1819–1905)
- R. C. Lehmann (1856–1929), Member of Parliament, writer and poet
- Rudolf Lehmann (SS officer) (1914–1983)
- Rudolf Lehmann (military judge) (1890–1955), Judge Advocate-General of the OKW, defendant in the High Command Trial
