= Krupp trial =

Post WWII war crimes trial

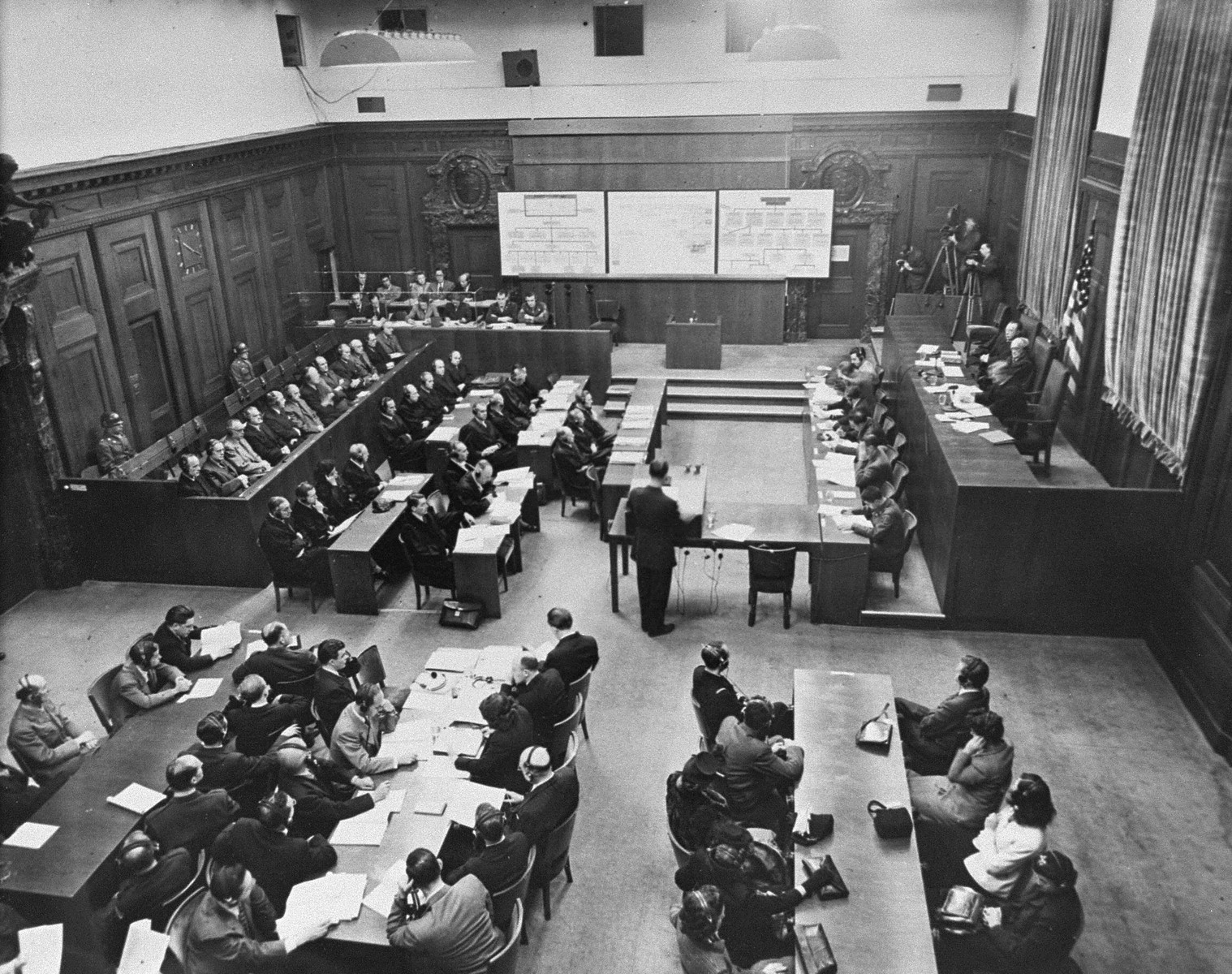
Prosecutor Telford Taylor (standing, center) opens the case against the defendants

The United States of America vs. Alfried Krupp, et al., commonly known as the Krupp trial, was the tenth of twelve trials for war crimes that U.S. authorities held in their occupation zone at Nuremberg, Germany, after the end of World War II. It concerned the forced labour enterprises of the Krupp Group and other crimes committed by the company.

These twelve trials were all held before U.S. military courts, not before the International Military Tribunal, but took place in the same rooms at the Palace of Justice. The twelve U.S. trials are collectively known as the "subsequent Nuremberg Trials" or, more formally, as the "Trials of War Criminals before the Nuremberg Military Tribunals" (NMT). The Krupp Trial was the third of three trials of German industrialists; the other two were the Flick Trial and the IG Farben Trial.

== The case ==
In the Krupp Trial, twelve former directors of the Krupp Group were accused of having enabled the armament of the German military forces and thus having actively participated in the Nazis' preparations for an aggressive war, and also for having used slave laborers in their companies. The main defendant was Alfried Krupp von Bohlen und Halbach, CEO of the Krupp Holding since 1943 and son of Gustav Krupp von Bohlen und Halbach who had been a defendant in the main Trial of the Major War Criminals before the IMT (where he was considered medically unfit for trial).

The judges in this case, heard before Military Tribunal III-A, were Hu C. Anderson (presiding judge), president of the court of appeals of Tennessee, Edward J. Daly from Connecticut, and William J. Wilkins from Seattle, Washington. The Chief of Counsel for the Prosecution was Telford Taylor; the Chief Trial Counsel was H. Russell Thayer, and Benjamin B. Ferencz participated as a Special Counsel. The indictment was presented on November 17, 1947; the trial lasted from December 8, 1947, until July 31, 1948. One defendant (Pfirsch) was acquitted, the others received prison sentences between three and twelve years, and the main defendant Alfried Krupp was ordered to sell all his possessions.

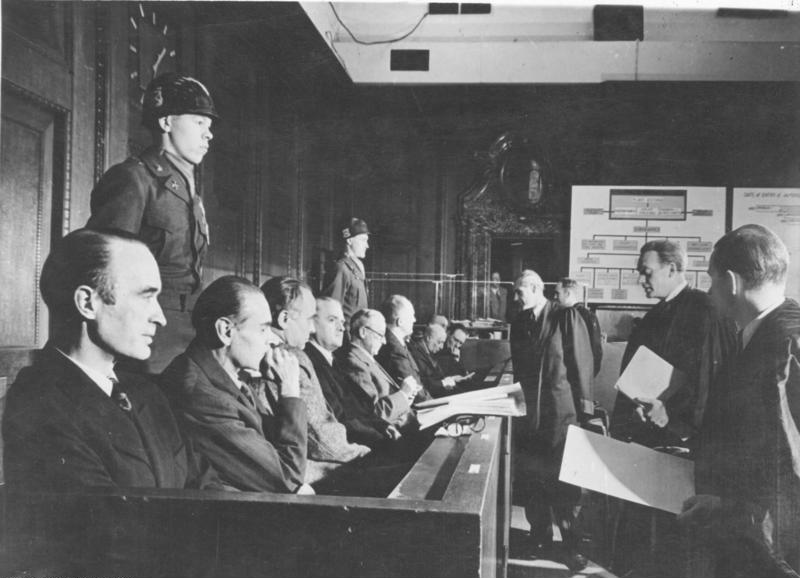
Defendants at the Krupp Trial, from left; Alfried Krupp, Ewald Löser, Eduard Houdremont, Erich Müller, Friedrich Janssen, Karl Pfirsch, and Karl Eberhardt

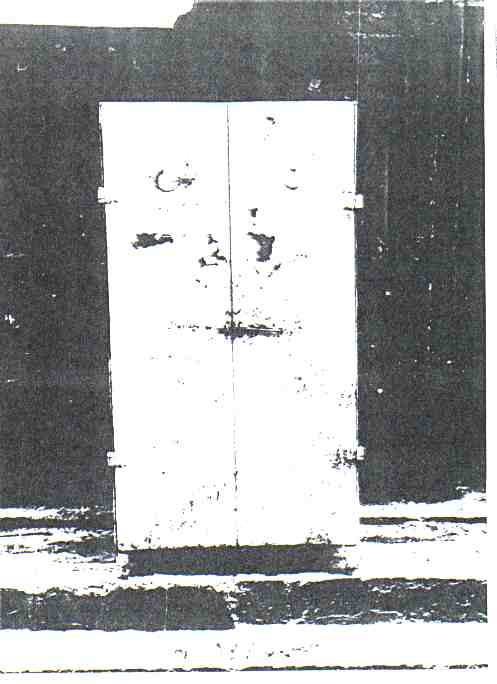
Krupp Punishement Cage for slave laborers

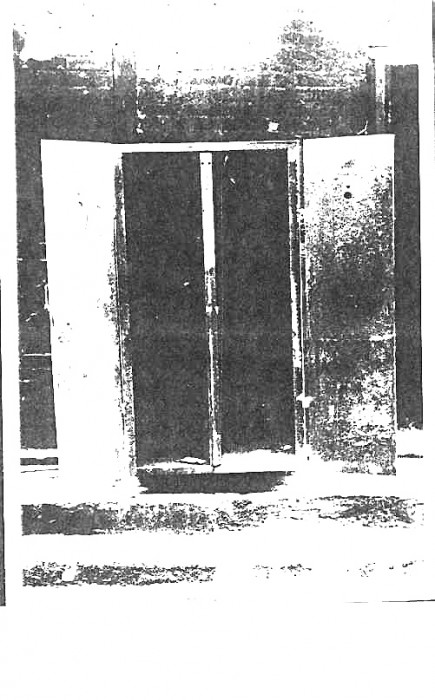
Krupp Punishement Cage for slave laborers

The main defendant Alfried Krupp always denied any guilt. In 1947, he stated:

The economy needed a steady or growing development. Because of the rivalries between the many political parties in Germany and the general disorder there was no opportunity for prosperity. ... We thought that Hitler would give us such a healthy environment. Indeed he did do that. ... We Krupps never cared much about [political] ideas. We only wanted a system that worked well and allowed us to work unhindered. Politics is not our business.

— Alfried Krupp, in Golo Mann's manuscript first published in (Friz 1988).

Indeed, the Krupp holding did flourish under the Nazi regime. According to conservative estimates, the Krupp enterprises used nearly 100,000 persons in the slave labour programme, about 23,000 of which were prisoners of war.

== Indictment ==
1. Crimes against peace by participating in the planning and waging of wars of aggression and wars in violation of international treaties;
2. Crimes against humanity by participating in the plundering, devastation, and exploitation of occupied countries;
3. Crimes against humanity by participating in the murder, extermination, enslavement, deportation, imprisonment, torture, and use for slave labor of civilians who came under German control, German nationals, and prisoners of war;
4. Participating in a common plan or conspiracy to commit crimes against peace.

All defendants were charged under counts 1, 3, and 4; count 2 excluded the defendants Lehmann and Kupke. Counts 1 and 4 were soon dropped due to lack of evidence.

== Defendants ==
Name	Function	Sentence
Alfried Krupp	owner and president	12 years plus forfeiture of property; sentence commuted to time served on January 31, 1951, by John J. McCloy and property restored to him. Died July 30, 1967.
Ewald Löser	former financial director	7 years; released on health grounds on June 2, 1951. Died December 23, 1970.
Eduard Houdremont	director, head of steel works	10 years; commuted to time served on January 31, 1951. Died June 10, 1958.
Erich Müller	director, head of arms fabrication	12 years; released early in 1952. Died April 15, 1963.
Friedrich Wilhelm Janssen	financial director, successor to Löser	10 years; commuted to time served on December 31, 1951, and released on February 4, 1952. In 1953, he returned to Friedrich Krupp AG and became General plenipotentiary of the Friedrich Krupp works in Essen next to Berthold Beitz. In 1955 he retired. During this two-year collaboration between Beitz and Janssen, Janssen became his paternal advisor, who introduced him to the group's individual works. Died October 9, 1956.
Karl Heinrich Pfirsch	former head of sales department	Acquitted. Died 1967.
Max Otto Ihn	Personnel and intelligence, deputy to Löser and Janssen	9 years; released on time served in February 1951. Died 1983.
Karl Adolf Ferdinand Eberhardt	head of sales, successor of Pfirsch	9 years; released on time served in February 1951.
Heinrich Leo Korschan	deputy head of steel plants	6 years; At the beginning of February 1951, Korschan was released from the war criminal prison in Landsberg. He then lived again in Essen-Bredeney. Died January 8, 1973.
Friedrich von Bülow	counterintelligence, public relations, and head of the plant police (Werkschutz)	12 years; sentence commuted to time served on January 31, 1951, and released the next day. Died January 17, 1984.
Werner Wilhelm Heinrich Lehmann	"labor procurement", deputy to Ihn	6 years; released February 1951.
Hans Albert Gustav Kupke	head of workers' camps	Time served. Died 1966.

All eleven defendants found guilty were convicted on the forced labor charge (count 3), and of the ten charged on count 2 (economic spoliation), six were convicted. On January 31, 1951, two and a half years after the sentences, ten (all except Löser) were released from prison. Since no buyer for the Krupp Holding had been found, Alfried Krupp resumed control of the firm in 1953.
