= Milch Trial =

Second of the twelve trials at Nuremberg for war crimes committed by Nazi Germany

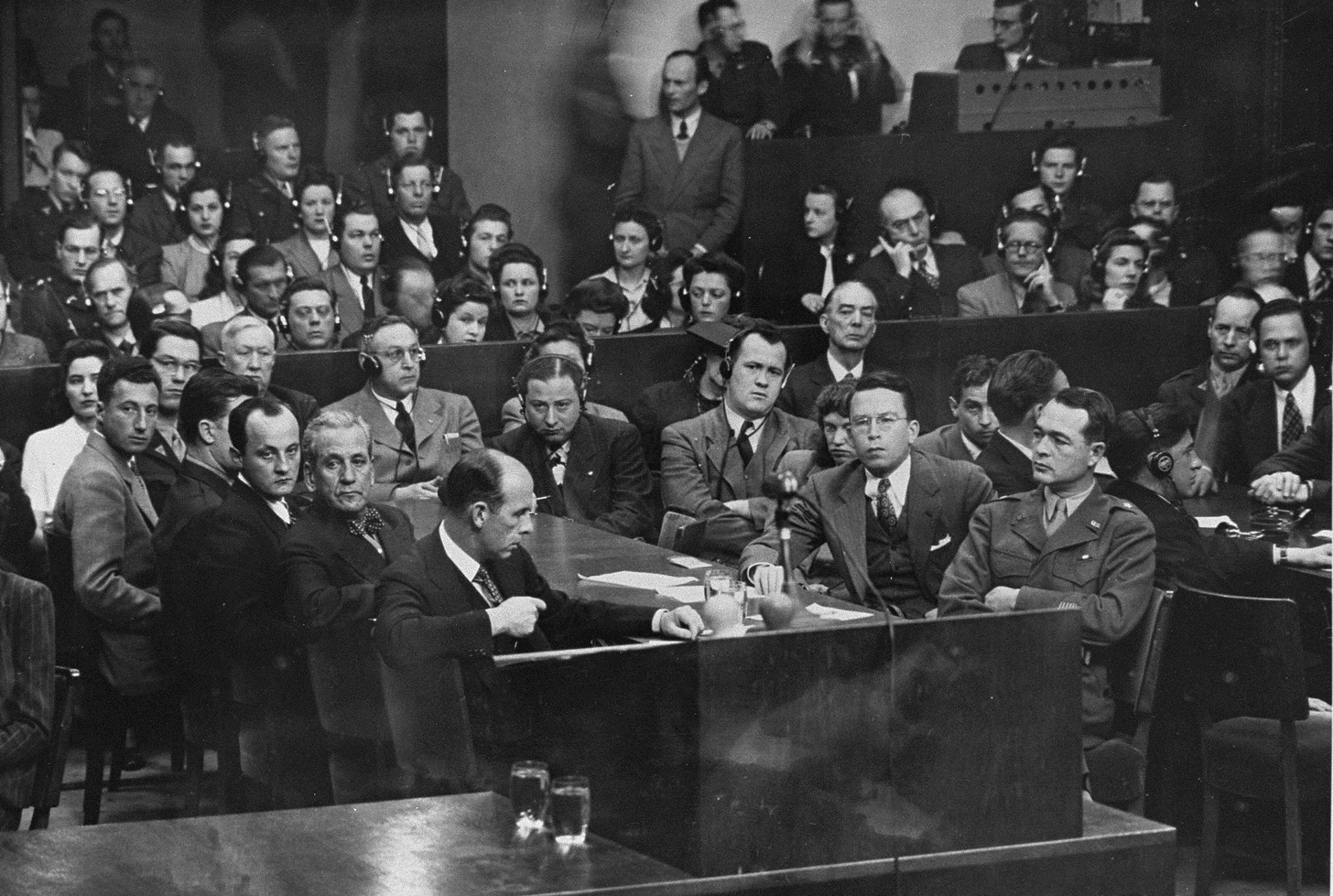
The prosecution team in the Milch Trial: front right is Telford Taylor (Chief Counsel). Across the table from him is Clark Denney (Chief Trial Counsel). Immediately to Taylor's right is Henry T. King (Assistant Counsel).

The United States of America vs. Erhard Milch, commonly known as the Milch Trial, was the second of the twelve "subsequent Nuremberg trials" for war crimes and crimes against humanity after the end of World War II between 1946 and 1947. The accused was Generalfeldmarschall Erhard Milch, formerly a very senior-ranking commander in the Luftwaffe, charged for utilizing forced labour of foreign workers under inhumane conditions in his role as chief of production and supply for the Luftwaffe.

The Milch Trial was held by United States authorities at the Palace of Justice in Nuremberg in the American occupation zone before US military courts, not before the International Military Tribunal. The indictment was presented on November 14, 1946 and Milch pleaded "not guilty" on all charges on December 20, 1946. The charges against Milch were summarized by Michael A. Musmanno (one of the tribunal judges) as follows:

1. Erhard Milch is charged with having knowingly committed war crimes as principal and accessory in enterprises involving slave labor and having also willingly and knowingly participated in enterprises involving the use of prisoners of war in war operations contrary to international convention and the laws and customs of war.
2. The defendant is accused of having knowingly and willfully participated in enterprises involving fatal medical experiments upon subjects without their consent.
3. In the third count the defendant is charged with responsibility for slave labor and fatal medical experiments, in the same manner as indicated in the first two counts, except that here the alleged victims are declared to be German nationals and nationals of other countries.

The judges in his case, heard before Military Tribunal II, were Robert M. Toms (presiding judge) from Detroit, Michigan, Fitzroy Donald Phillips from North Carolina, Michael A. Musmanno from Pittsburgh, Pennsylvania, and John J. Speight from Alabama (as an alternate judge). The Chief of Counsel for the Prosecution was Telford Taylor, and the Chief Trial Counsel was Clark Denney. The assistant counsel for the prosecution included James S. Conway, Dorothy M. Hunt, Henry T. King, Jr., Raymond J. McMahon, Jr., and Maurice C. Myers. The defense counsels were Friedrich Bergold and Werner Milch (the brother of the defendant). The trial lasted from January 2 to April 17, 1947.

Generalfeldmarschall Milch was found guilty on counts 1 and 3, but acquitted him on count 2 of the indictment, being sentenced to life imprisonment at Rebdorf Prison near Munich. The sentence was commuted by John J. McCloy, U.S. High Commissioner of Germany, to 15 years of imprisonment in 1951. During his incarceration, Milch filed an application for leave to file a petition for a writ of habeas corpus before the Supreme Court of the United States. The Court denied leave on jurisdictional grounds by a vote of 4-4, with four justices (Black, Douglas, Murphy, and Rutledge) voting for a full hearing on the issue of jurisdiction, and Justice Robert H. Jackson, who was the lead prosecutor during the Nuremberg war crimes trials, recusing himself. Milch was paroled in June 1954.
