= High Command Trial =

Post-WWII war crimes trial

The High Command Trial
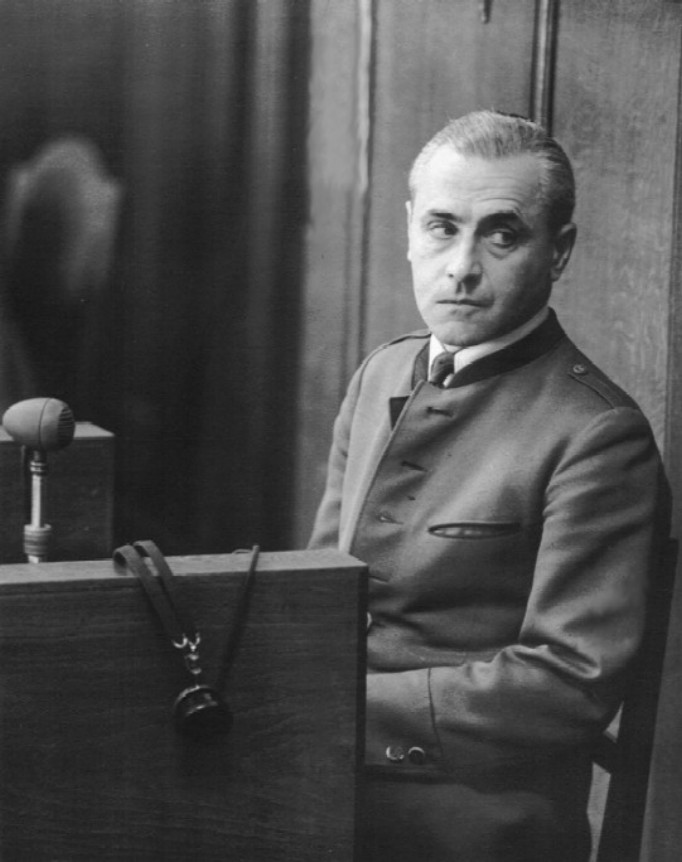
- Walter Warlimont in the defendants' dock of the High Command Case at Nuremberg
- Court: Nuremberg
- Full case name: The United States of America vs. Wilhelm von Leeb, et al
- Indictment: 28 November 1947
- Decided: 28 October 1948, Nuremberg

The High Command Trial (officially, The United States of America vs. Wilhelm von Leeb, et al.), also known initially as Case No. 12 (the 13 Generals' Trial), and later as Case No. 72 (the German high command trial: Trial of Wilhelm von Leeb and thirteen others), was the last of the twelve trials for war crimes the U.S. authorities held in their occupation zone of Germany in Nuremberg after the end of World War II. These twelve trials were all held before U.S. military courts, not before the International Military Tribunal, but took place in the same rooms at the Palace of Justice. The twelve U.S. trials are collectively known as the "subsequent Nuremberg trials" or, more formally, as the "Trials of War Criminals before the Nuremberg Military Tribunals" (NMT).

== Background ==
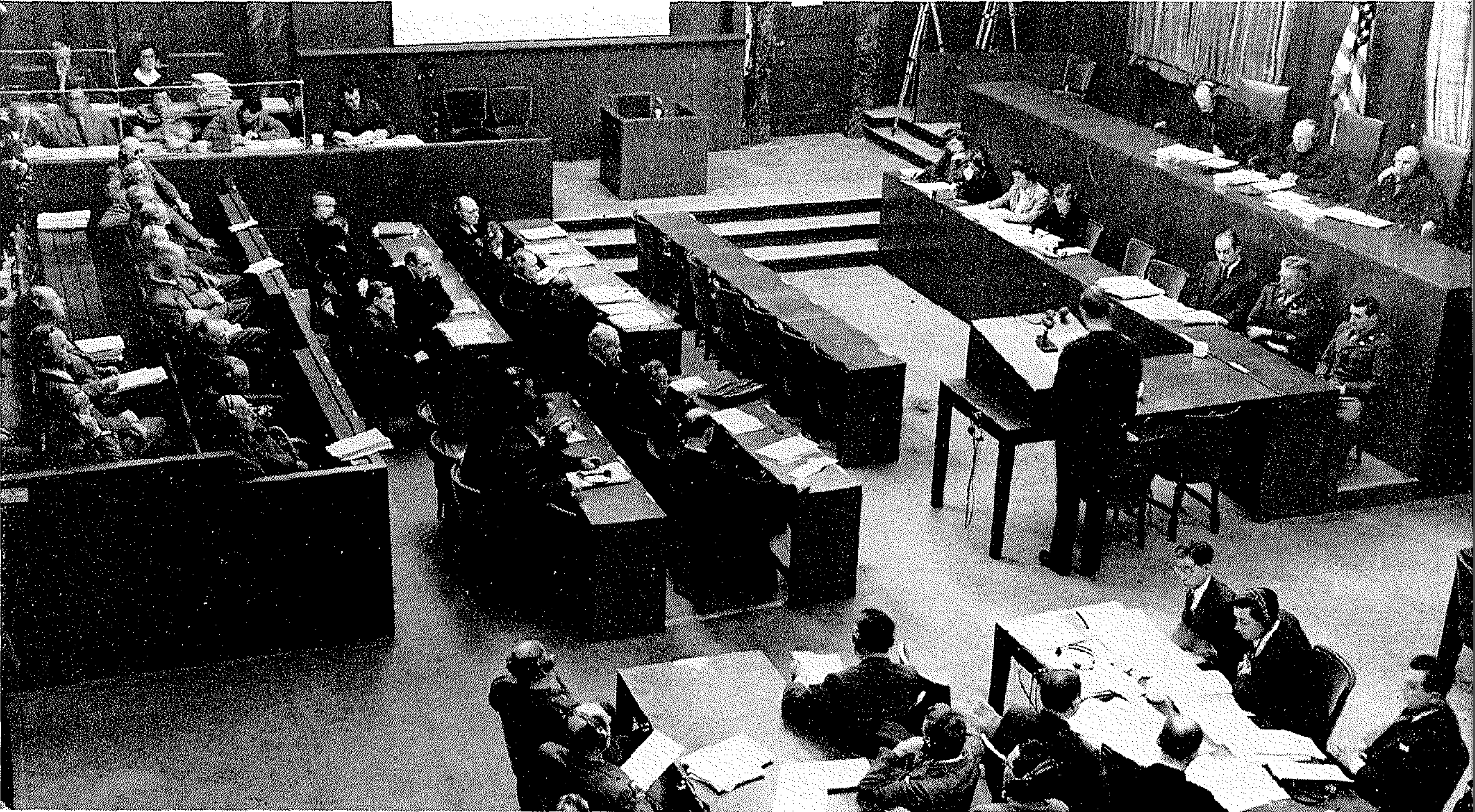
High Command Trial courtroom

The accused in this trial were high-ranking generals of the German Wehrmacht (including two field marshals of the Army, one field marshal of the air force and one general admiral), some of whom had been members of the High Command of Nazi Germany's military forces. They were charged with having participated in or planned or facilitated the execution of the numerous war crimes and atrocities committed in countries occupied by the German forces during the war.

The judges in this case, heard before Military Tribunal V-A, were the American John C. Young (presiding judge), Winfield B. Hale, and Justin W. Harding. The Chief of Counsel for the Prosecution was Telford Taylor. The indictment was filed on November 28, 1947; the trial lasted from December 30 that year until October 28, 1948.

== Indictment ==
The accused faced four charges of having committed war crimes and crimes against humanity:

1. Crimes against peace by waging aggressive war against other nations and violating international treaties.
2. War crimes by being responsible for murder, ill-treatment and other crimes against prisoners of war and enemy belligerents.
3. Crimes against humanity by participating or ordering the murder, torture, deportation, hostage-taking, etc. of civilians.
4. Participating and organizing the formulations and execution of a common plan and conspiracy to commit aforementioned crimes.

All defendants were indicted on all counts and pleaded "not guilty". Count 4 of the indictment, the conspiracy charge, was soon dropped by the tribunal because it was already covered by the other charges. On count 1, the tribunal considered all of the accused not guilty and stated that they were not the policy-makers and that preparing for war and fighting a war 'on orders' was not a criminal offense under the applicable international law of the time.

== Defendants and judgments ==
Of the 14 defendants indicted, Otto Schniewind and Hugo Sperrle were acquitted on all counts. Johannes Blaskowitz committed suicide during the trial and the 11 remaining defendants received prison sentences ranging from three years to lifetime imprisonment. All sentences included time already served in custody since 7 April 1945. The table below shows, with respect to each charge, whether the accused were either indicted but not convicted (I) or indicted and found guilty (G) and is listed by defendant, charge and outcome.

Photos	Name	Count				Penalty	Notes
Photos	Name	1	2	3	4	Penalty	Notes
	Wilhelm von Leeb	I	I	G	I	Time served	Former Generalfeldmarschall. Commander of Army Group North in the Soviet Union (June 1941 – January 1942). Convicted of transmitting the Barbarossa decree and its criminal application by subordinate units. Released after trial as time served. Died in 1956.
	Hugo Sperrle	I	I	I	I	Acquitted	Former Luftwaffe Generalfeldmarschall. Commanded Luftflotte 3 (February 1939 – August 1944). Died in 1953.
	Georg von Küchler	I	G	G	I	20 years	Former Generalfeldmarschall. Commander of 18th Army on the Eastern Front, and later of Army Group North. While it was not discovered yet at the time of his trial, he had been directly involved in the murder of mentally disabled people. In December 1941, with Küchler's express consent, the SD shot 240 mental patients. Sentence reviewed in 1951, commuted to 12 years. Released in 1953 on good time credit. Died in 1968.
	Johannes Blaskowitz	—	—	—	—	—	Former Generaloberst. Commanded Army Group G and Army Group H in France and the Netherlands (1944–1945). Committed suicide during the trial on 5 February 1948.
	Hermann Hoth	I	G	G	I	15 years	Former Generaloberst. Commanded the 3rd Panzer Group during Operation Barbarossa in 1941, and the 4th Panzer Army during the Wehrmacht's 1942 summer offensive. In support of the Commissar Order, issued a directive in November 1941 instructing his subordinate commanders to "immediately and pitilessly exterminate" "every sign of active or passive resistance (...) on the part of Jewish-Bolshevik agitators". Sentence was reviewed with no changes in 1951. Released on parole in 1954; released from parole / sentence reduced to time served in 1957. Died in 1971.
	Georg-Hans Reinhardt	I	G	G	I	15 years	Former Generaloberst. Troops under Reinhardt's command implemented the Commissar Order on the Eastern Front and also deported civilians to concentration camps. Sentence reviewed in 1951, with no changes. Released in 1952 on compassionate grounds. Died in 1963.
	Hans von Salmuth	I	G	G	I	20 years	Former Generaloberst. Salmuth implemented the Commissar Order, including murder and mistreatment of Soviet prisoners of war. He was also found guilty of murder, deportation, and hostage-taking of civilians. Sentence reviewed in 1951, commuted to 12 years and backdated to June 1945. Released in July 1953 on good time credit. Died in 1962.
	Karl-Adolf Hollidt	I	G	G	I	5 years	Former Generaloberst. Released on good time credit in December 1949. Died in 1985.
	Otto Schniewind	I	I	I	I	Acquitted	Former Generaladmiral. Fleet commander (Kriegsmarine) (June 1941 – July 1944). Died in 1964.
	Karl von Roques	I	G	G	I	20 years	Former General der Infanterie. As commander of the rear areas of Army Group South, Roques carried out extermination policies against Soviet partisans, and Slavic & Jewish civilians. Died in custody on 24 December 1949.
	Hermann Reinecke	I	G	G	I	Life imprisonment	Former General der Infanterie. Head of the OKW's General Office of the Armed Forces, responsible for creation and implementation of the POW policy that resulted in the deaths of approx. 3.3 million Soviet prisoners of war. Released in October 1954. Died in 1973.
	Walter Warlimont	I	G	G	I	Life imprisonment	Former General der Artillerie and Chief of the Department of National Defense in the OKW. Responsible for the Barbarossa decree which allowed the murder of civilians on the pretext of counteracting partisan activity. Sentence commuted to 18 years in 1951. Released in June 1954. Died in 1976.
	Otto Wöhler	I	G	G	I	8 years	Former General der Infanterie. Convicted of implementing the Barbarossa decree, deportation of civilians for slave labor and cooperation with Einsatzgruppen. Released in 1951. Died in 1987.
	Rudolf Lehmann	I	G	G	I	7 years	Former Generaloberstabsrichter. Judge Advocate-General of the OKW and responsible for the Barbarossa decree which allowed the murder of civilians on the pretext of counteracting partisan activity He drafted the December 1941 Night and Fog decree which removed access to due process from the accused. Wehrmacht troops applied the order in France, Holland, Ukraine, and other occupied countries. Was involved in formulating the Commando Order and the Terror and Sabotage Decree. Released in 1950 on good time credit. Died in 1955.

== Aftermath ==
Public opinion in Germany was against the trial. Many denied the facts found by the U.S. judges, extolled the defense of obedience to superior orders and praised the soldierly qualities of the defendants. Particularly active were the Protestant and Catholic Churches.

After the emergence of the Federal Republic, German Chancellor Konrad Adenauer and the Bundestag weighed in on the side of the defendants. German leverage increased as the urgency of rearming Germany grew. Under these intense pressures, in 1950, U.S. High Commissioner John McCloy established a review panel chaired by Judge David Peck of New York and, on its recommendation, reduced the sentences of three of the six High Command defendants who were still in prison. After further proceedings by mixed commissions composed of Allied and German members, the last of the High Command defendants returned home in 1954.

== See also ==
- Command responsibility
- Subsequent Nuremberg trials
