= Charles B. Sears =

American judge (1870–1950)

Charles Brown Sears (October 16, 1870 – December 17, 1950) was an American lawyer and politician from New York.

== Life ==
Sears was born in Brooklyn. He graduated from Adelphia Academy in Brooklyn in 1888, and A.B. from Yale University in 1892. After studying at the University of Berlin in 1892-93, he graduated LL.B. from Harvard Law School in 1896. He was admitted to the bar in 1895, and practiced in Buffalo. On October 20, 1896, he married Florence Gilbert (d. 1939), of Brookline, Massachusetts. He was a delegate to the New York State Constitutional Convention of 1915. He was President of the Erie County Bar Association from 1915 to 1916.

In 1917, he was appointed by Governor Charles S. Whitman a justice of the New York Supreme Court to fill a vacancy, and was re-elected in November 1917, and 1931. From 1922 on, he sat on the Appellate Division (Fourth Dept.), and was presiding justice from 1927 on.

In 1934, he ran on the Republican ticket for the New York Court of Appeals but was defeated by Democrat Edward R. Finch. He was a delegate to the New York State Constitutional Convention of 1938 at which he chaired the Judiciary Committee.

In January 1940, he was appointed by Governor Herbert H. Lehman to the Court of Appeals to fill the vacancy caused by the election of Irving Lehman as Chief Judge. He retired from the bench at the end of 1940 when the appointment expired and he reached the constitutional age limit of 70 years, thus being barred from seeking re-election. He then served as an official referee of the court.

On November 24, 1946, he married Mary Vanderpoel Hun. In 1947, he was the Presiding Judge of Military Tribunal IV during the Flick Trial in Nuremberg, Germany.

He served as Vice Chairman and member of the Council of the University at Buffalo. He was the recipient of the Chancellor's Medal of the University in 1944. When the Law School of the University moved in 1973 to its new building, O'Brian Hall on the North Campus, the law library was named in honor of Charles B. Sears.

He was honored with a LL.D. degree by several universities and colleges: Middlebury College, 1930; Columbia University, 1936; Yale University, 1936; Saint Lawrence University, 1939; Syracuse University, 1940; and Hobart College, 1942.

Sears died in Buffalo, New York.

== Sources ==
- Appellate Division, Fourth Department, 100th Anniversary New York State Unified Court System
- Friends of UB Dies University of Buffalo Alumni Publication, 1951-01-01
- CHARLES B. SEARS, JURIST, DIES AT 80 in NYT on December 18, 1950 (subscription required)
