= Dave King (novelist) =

American novelist and poet

- Born: 1955 (age 70–71); Meriden, Connecticut, U.S.
- Education: Cooper Union (BFA); Columbia University (MFA)
- Occupations: Novelist; poet
- Spouse: Franklin Tartaglione
- Parent(s): Henry T. King; Betty May Scranton
- Writing career
- Notable awards: Rome Prize (2007)
- Website: www.davekingwriter.com

Dave King (born 1955) is an American novelist and poet who lives in Brooklyn, in New York City. He was born in 1955 in Meriden, Connecticut. His father, Henry T. King, was a U.S. prosecutor at the Nuremberg Trials.

His first novel, The Ha-Ha, was published in 2005 and was named one of the best books of that year by The Washington Post, The Christian Science Monitor, and the Pittsburgh Tribune-Review. The Ha-Ha was a finalist for The Book of the Month Club's Best Literary Fiction Award and the Quill Foundation's award for Best Debut Fiction and was named one of Amazon's Best Books of the Year (2005). The New York Times Book Review wrote, "The Ha-Ha is full of emotional truth and establishes King as a writer of consequence."

== Life ==
King holds a BFA in painting and film from Cooper Union (received 1980) and an MFA in writing from Columbia University (2000). At Cooper Union, he studied with Jim Dine, Lee Krasner, and Robert Breer, among others. He was part of the East Village art scene, then formed a company specializing in murals and trompe-l'œil painting. That company, with which King is no longer affiliated, still exists under the name Franklin Tartaglione, LLC. At Columbia, he worked with Michael Cunningham, Fenton Johnson, Richard Howard, April Bernard, Lucie Brock Broido and David Plante. The Ha-Ha, in substantially different form, was his thesis project.

King was awarded the 2006-07 John Guare Writers Fund Rome Prize Fellowship in Literature at the American Academy in Rome. He has taught cultural studies at The School of Visual Arts and writing at Baruch College and New York University.

King is married to painter Franklin Tartaglione, his life partner since 1975.

== Poetry ==
King's poetry has been published in The Paris Review and Big City Lit, and he has been nominated for a Pushcart Prize.

== Editorial Work ==
In 1998 and 1999, King was editor-in-chief of Columbia, Columbia University's literary journal. While completing The Ha-Ha, he worked as an editor at The Little Bookroom, in New York.
