= Ewald Loeser =

German lawyer and war criminal (1888–1970)

Ewald Löser
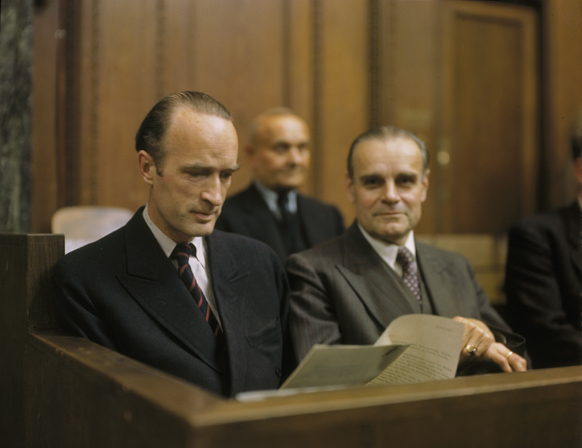
- Löser (right) during the Krupp trial
- Born: 11 April 1888; Storkow, German Empire
- Died: 23 December 1970 (aged 82); West Germany
- Status: Deceased
- Conviction: Crimes against humanity
- Trial: Krupp trial
- Penalty: 7 years imprisonment

Ewald Oskar Ludwig Löser (11 April 1888 – 23 December 1970) was a German lawyer, a board member of Krupp AG and a convicted war criminal for Krupp's use of forced labor. He was also a member of the 20 July plot.

He was born in Storkow, Brandenburg and gained a doctorate in Administrative Law from The University of Göttingen in 1911. From 1930 to 1934 he served under Carl Goerdeler as the deputy mayor and treasurer of the city of Leipzig.

He joined board of the Friedrich Krupp AG in 1934 as Director of Administration and Finance. From 1939 he was also on the board of Dresdner Bank. In 1943, Goerdeler convinced him of the necessity of a coup to overthrow Hitler. If the 20 July plot assassination attempt had succeeded. he was earmarked to be the Minister of Finance. Löser was arrested in its aftermath and on 20 October 1944 was tried by the People's Court, but succeeded in convincing Roland Freisler that he was suffering from memory loss. Avoiding conviction he was committed to a sanatorium and survived the war.

In 1947, Löser was indicted at the Krupp Trial for war crimes, including use of slave labor and plunder of occupied Europe. He was found guilty of crimes against humanity and sentenced to 7 years in prison. Löser was not granted clemency, but was released early on health grounds on 2 June 1951. He died in 1970.
