= Reassessing the Nuremberg Military Tribunals =

2012 book

Reassessing the Nuremberg Military Tribunals. Transitional Justice, Trial Narratives, and Historiography
- First edition cover
- Editor: Kim Priemel; Alexa Stiller
- Language: English
- Genre: Non-fiction
- Publisher: Berghahn Books
- Publication date: 2012

Reassessing the Nuremberg Military Tribunals. Transitional Justice, Trial Narratives, and Historiography is a book published in 2012 by Berghahn Books; it was edited by Kim Priemel and Alexa Stiller.
