= 7th Division (Reichswehr) =

- 7. Division
- Active: 1921–1934
- Disbanded: October 1934
- Country: Weimar Republic
- Branch: Reichsheer
- Type: Infantry
- Size: Division
- Part of: Gruppenkommando 2
- Garrison/HQ: Wehrkreis VII: Munich

Commanders
- Notable commanders: Wilhelm Ritter von Leeb

The 7th Division was a unit of the Reichswehr.

== Creation ==
In the Order of 31 July 1920 for the Reduction of the Army (to comply with the upper limits on the size of the military contained in the Treaty of Versailles), it was determined that in every Wehrkreis (military district) a division would be established by 1 October 1920. The 7th Division was formed in January 1921 out of the Reichswehr's 21st, 23rd, and 24th Brigades, all part of the former Übergangsheer (Transition Army).

It consisted of 3 infantry regiments, the 19th, 20th, and 21st (Bavarian). It also consisted of the 7th artillery regiment, an engineering battalion, a signals battalion, a transportation battalion, and a medical battalion.

The commander of Wehrkreis VII was simultaneously the commander of the 7th Division. For the leadership of the troops, an Infanterieführer and an Artillerieführer were appointed, both subordinated to the commander of the division.

The unit ceased to exist as such after October 1934, and its subordinate units were transferred to the 21 new divisions created in that year.

== Divisional commanders ==
- General der Infanterie Arnold Ritter von Möhl (1 October 1920 - 1 January 1923)
- Generalleutnant Otto von Lossow (1 January 1923 - 20 March 1924)
- General der Artillerie Friedrich Freiherr Kress von Kressenstein (20 March 1924 - 1 January 1928)
- General der Infanterie Adolf Ritter von Ruith (1 January 1928 - 1 February 1930)
- Generalleutnant Wilhelm Ritter von Leeb (1 February 1930 - 1 October 1933)
- General der Infanterie Wilhelm Adam (1 October 1933 - 30 September 1935)

=== Infantrieführers ===
- Generalmajor Franz von Epp (1 October 1920 - 31 October 1923)
- Generalmajor Eugen von Schobert (1 August 1934 - 14 October 1935)

=== Artillerieführers ===
- Generalmajor Friedrich Dollmann (1 October 1932 - 31 January 1933)

== Garrison ==
The divisional headquarters was in Munich.
