= Kim Christian Priemel =

German historian (born 1977)

Kim Christian Priemel (born 1977) is a historian of Germany and former professor at Humboldt University Berlin; he now works for the University of Oslo.

== Works ==
- Bähr, Johannes; Drecoll, Axel; Gotto, Bernhard; Priemel, Kim Christian; Wixforth, Harald (2008). Der Flick-Konzern im Dritten Reich: Herausgegeben durch das Institut für Zeitgeschichte München-Berlin im Auftrag der Stiftung Preußischer Kulturbesitz (in German). Oldenbourg Wissenschaftsverlag. ISBN 978-3-486-58683-1.
- Priemel, Kim Christian (2013). Flick: Eine Konzerngeschichte vom Kaiserreich bis zur Bundesrepublik (in German). Wallstein Verlag. ISBN 978-3-8353-2091-8.
- Priemel, Kim Christian (2016). The Betrayal: The Nuremberg Trials and German Divergence. Oxford University Press. ISBN 978-0-19-164852-6.
