= Subsequent Nuremberg trials =

1946–1949 trials of Nazi leadership

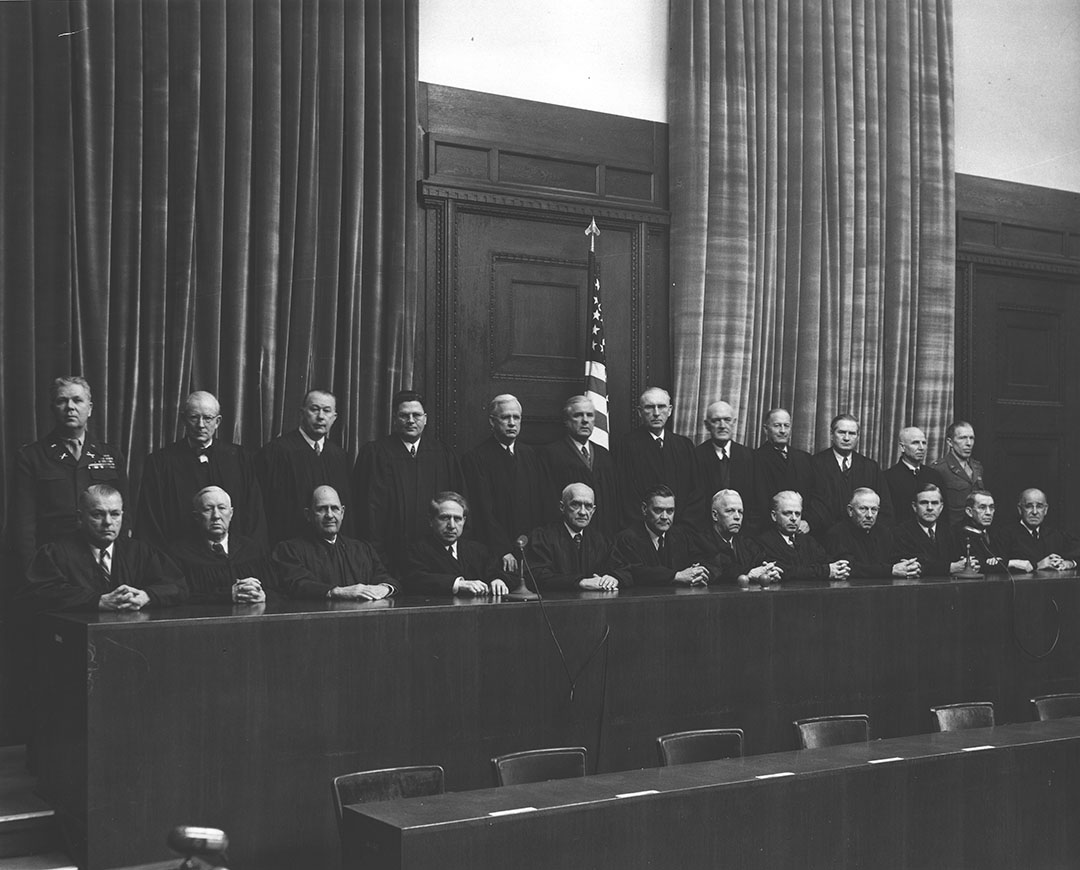
Judges of the Nuremberg Military Tribunals pose for a group photo.

The subsequent Nuremberg trials (also Nuremberg Military Tribunals; 1946–1949) were twelve trials for war crimes committed by the leaders of Nazi Germany (1933–1945). (Note: The series of twelve Subsequent Nuremberg Trials are known as Nuremberg Military Tribunals (NMT). Despite this nomenclature, the proceedings were entirely conducted within a civilian judicial framework rather than under military courts. The inclusion of the term "military" in the tribunal's title reflects the administrative oversight of the Office of Military Government, United States (OMGUS). As the governing authority in the American zone of occupied Germany, OMGUS was responsible for their oversight.)

The Nuremberg Military Tribunals occurred after the Nuremberg trials, held by the International Military Tribunal, which concluded in October 1946. The subsequent Nuremberg trials were held by U.S. civilian courts and dealt with the cases of crimes against humanity committed by the business community of Nazi Germany, specifically the crimes of using slave labor and plundering occupied countries, and the war crime cases of Wehrmacht officers who committed atrocities against Allied prisoners of war, partisans, and guerrillas.

== Background ==
The Allies had initially planned to convene several international trials for war crimes at the International Military Tribunal, but failed because the Allies could not agree upon the proper legal management and disposition of military and civilian war criminals; however, the Control Council Law No. 10 (20 December 1945) of the Allied Control Council empowered the military authorities of every occupation zone in Germany to place on trial people and soldiers suspected of being war criminals. Based on this law, the U.S. authorities proceeded after the end of the initial Nuremberg Trial against the major war criminals to hold another twelve trials in Nuremberg. The judges in all these trials were American, and so were the prosecutors; the chief of counsel for the prosecution was Brigadier General Telford Taylor. In the other occupation zones, similar trials took place.

== Trials ==
The twelve U.S. trials after the Nuremberg Military Tribunals (NMT) took place from 9 December 1946 to 13 April 1949. The trials were as follows:

#	Designations	Dates	Defendants
1	Doctors' Trial	9 December 1946 – 20 August 1947	23 Nazi physicians of the Aktion T4
2	Milch Trial	2 January – 14 April 1947	Field Marshal Erhard Milch of the Luftwaffe
3	Judges' Trial	5 March – 4 December 1947	16 Nazi German "racial purity" jurists
4	Pohl Trial	8 April – 3 November 1947	Oswald Pohl and 17 SS officers
5	Flick Trial	19 April – 22 December 1947	Friedrich Flick and 5 directors of his companies
6	IG Farben Trial	27 August 1947 – 30 July 1948	24 directors of IG Farben, maker of Zyklon B
7	Hostages Trial	8 July 1947 – 19 February 1948	12 German generals of the Balkan Campaign
8	RuSHA Trial	20 October 1947 – 10 March 1948	14 racial cleansing and resettlement officials
9	Einsatzgruppen Trial	29 September 1947 – 10 April 1948	24 officers of Einsatzgruppen
10	Krupp Trial	8 December 1947 – 31 July 1948	12 directors of the Krupp Group
11	Ministries Trial	6 January 1948 – 13 April 1949	21 officials of Reich ministries
12	High Command Trial	30 December 1947 – 28 October 1948	13 generals and 1 admiral of the High Command

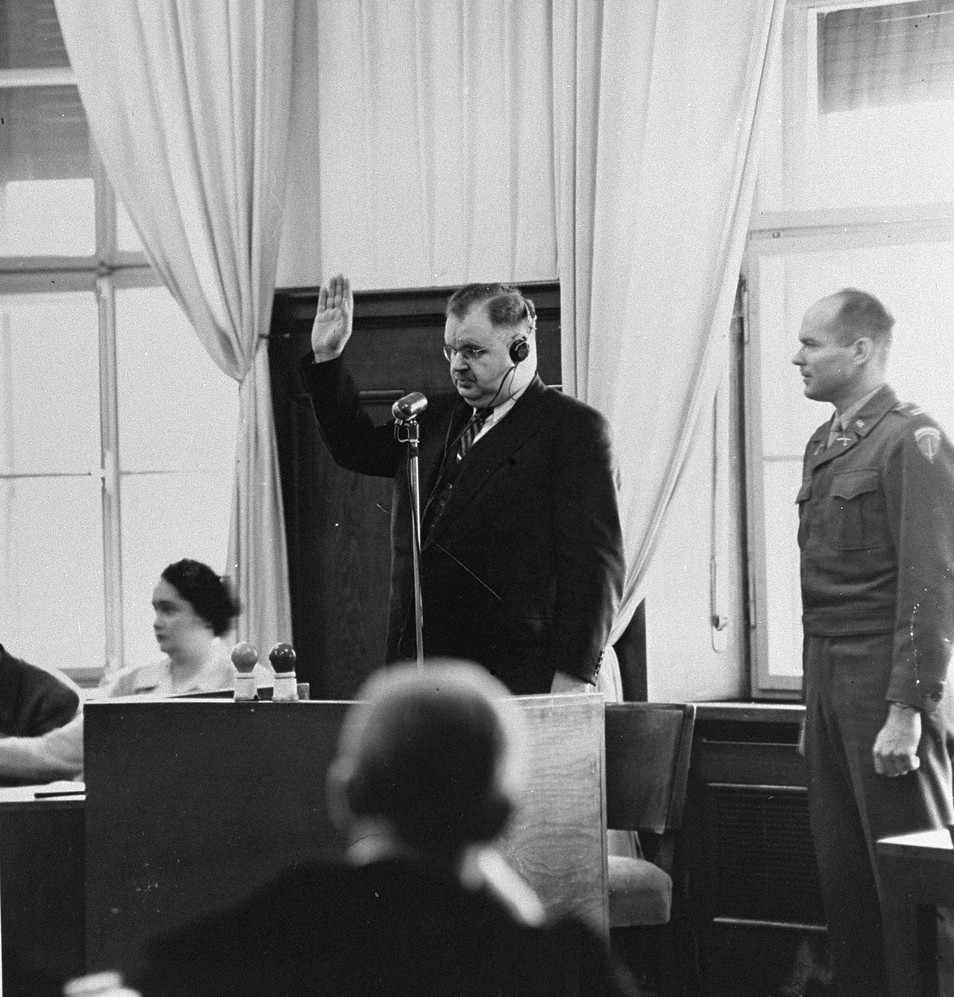
Auschwitz survivor Philipp Auerbach testifies for the prosecution in the Ministries Trial.

== Result ==
The Nuremberg process initiated 3,887 cases of which about 3,400 were dropped. 489 cases went to trial, involving 1,672 defendants. A total of 1,416 of them were found guilty; fewer than 200 were executed, and another 279 defendants were sentenced to life in prison. By the 1950s almost all of them had been released.

Many of the longer prison sentences were reduced substantially by an amnesty under the decree of high commissioner John J. McCloy in 1951, after intense political pressure. Ten outstanding death sentences from the Einsatzgruppen Trial were converted to prison terms. Many others who had received prison sentences were released outright.

== Criticism ==
Some of the Nuremberg Military Tribunals have been criticised for their conclusion that "morale bombing" of civilians, including its nuclear variety, was legal, and for their judgment that, in certain situations, executing civilians in reprisal was permissible.

== Judges ==
Judge	Position	Designations	Previous or current position
Hu C. Anderson	Presiding judge	Krupp Trial	President of the Tennessee Court of Appeals
Walter B. Beals	Presiding judge	Doctors' Trial	Justice of the Washington Supreme Court
Mallory B. Blair	Judge	Judges' Trial	Judge of the Third Court of Appeals of Texas
James T. Brand	Judge	Judges' Trial	Associate justice of the Supreme Court of Oregon
George J. Burke	Judge	Hostages Trial	Former prosecuting attorney of Washtenaw County, Michigan
Edward F. Carter	Judge	Hostages Trial	Associate justice of the Nebraska Supreme Court
William C. Christianson	Presiding judge	Ministries Trial	Associate justice of the Minnesota Supreme Court
William C. Christianson	Judge	Flick Trial	Minnesota Supreme Court Justice
Johnson T. Crawford	Judge	RuSHA Trial	Judge of the Oklahoma Court of Appeals
Johnson T. Crawford	Judge	Doctors' Trial	Judge of the Oklahoma Court of Appeals
Edward J. Daly	Judge	Krupp Trial	Associate justice, Connecticut Supreme Court
Richard D. Dixon	Alternate judge	Flick Trial	North Carolina Superior Court judge
Richard D. Dixon	Judge	Einsatzgruppen Trial	North Carolina Superior Court judge
Winfield B. Hale	Judge	High Command Trial	Judge, Tennessee Court of Appeals
Justin W. Harding	Judge	High Command Trial	Bar of the State of Ohio
Justin W. Harding	Alternate judge	Judges' Trial	Bar of the State of Ohio
Paul M. Hebert	Judge	IG Farben Trial	Dean of the Law School of Louisiana State University
Robert F. Maguire	Judge	Ministries Trial	Master in Chancery United States District Court for the District of Oregon
Carrington T. Marshall	Presiding judge	Judges' Trial	Chief justice of the Supreme Court of Ohio
Clarence F. Merrell	Alternate judge	IG Farben Trial	Lawyer from Indiana (friend of Judge Shake)
James Morris	Judge	IG Farben Trial	Justice of the North Dakota Supreme Court
Michael Musmanno	Presiding judge	Einsatzgruppen Trial	Military governor of an occupied district in Italy
Michael Musmanno	Judge	Milch Trial	Military governor of an occupied district in Italy
Michael Musmanno	Judge	Pohl Trial	Military governor of an occupied district in Italy
Daniel T. O'Connell	Judge	RuSHA Trial	Associate justice of the Massachusetts Supreme Judicial Court
Fitzroy Donald Phillips	Judge	Milch Trial	Judge, North Carolina Superior Court
Fitzroy Donald Phillips	Judge	Pohl Trial	Judge, North Carolina Superior Court
Leon W. Powers	Judge	Ministries Trial	Justice of the Iowa Supreme Court
Frank Richman	Judge	Flick Trial	Indiana Supreme Court justice
Harold Sebring	Judge	Doctors' Trial	Justice of the Florida Supreme Court
Charles B. Sears	Presiding judge	Flick Trial	Chief judge of the New York Court of Appeals
Curtis Grover Shake	Presiding judge	IG Farben Trial	Chief judge of the Indiana Supreme Court
John J. Speight	Judge	Einsatzgruppen Trial	Lawyer from Alabama
John J. Speight	Alternate judge	Milch Trial	Lawyer from Alabama
John J. Speight	Alternate judge	Pohl Trial	Lawyer from Alabama
Victor C. Swearingen	Alternate judge	Doctors' Trial	Special assistant to the attorney general of the United States
Robert M. Toms	Presiding judge	Milch Trial	Judge of the Circuit Court for Wayne County, Michigan
Robert M. Toms	Presiding judge	Pohl Trial	Judge of the Circuit Court for Wayne County, Michigan
Charles F. Wennerstrum	Presiding judge	Hostages Trial	Chief justice of the Iowa Supreme Court
William J. Wilkins	Judge	Krupp Trial	King County Superior Court judge
Lee B. Wyatt	Presiding judge	RuSHA Trial	Associate justice of the Supreme Court of Georgia
John C. Young	Presiding judge	High Command Trial	Former chief justice, Colorado Supreme Court

== Bibliography ==
- Baars, Grietje (2013). "Capitalism's Victor's Justice? The Hidden Stories Behind the Prosecution of Industrialists Post-WWII". In Heller, Kevin; Simpson, Gerry (eds.). The Hidden Histories of War Crimes Trials. Oxford University Press. ISBN 978-0-19-967114-4.
- Dubois, Josiah E. (1952). The Devil's Chemists (PDF). Boston, MA: Beacon Press. ASIN B000ENNDV6. Archived from the original (PDF) on 2012-06-17.
- Earl, Hilary (2009). The Nuremberg SS-Einsatzgruppen Trial, 1945–1958: Atrocity, Law, and History. New York, Cambridge: Cambridge Press. ISBN 9780521456081.
- Heller, Kevin Jon (2012). The Nuremberg Military Tribunals and the Origins of International Criminal Law. Oxford University Press. ISBN 978-0-19-165286-8.
- Priemel, Kim C.; Stiller, Alexa, eds. (2012). Reassessing the Nuremberg Military Tribunals: Transitional Justice, Trial Narratives, and Historiography. Berghahn Books. ISBN 978-0-85745-532-1.
- Taylor, Telford (1949). Final Report to the Secretary of the Army on the Nuernberg War Crimes Trials Under Control Council Law No. 10. Washington, D. C.: U.S. Government Printing Office.

== See also ==
- Command responsibility doctrine of hierarchical accountability
- Research Materials: Max Planck Society Archive

Trials

- Auschwitz Trial held in Kraków, Poland in 1947 against 40 SS-staff of the Auschwitz concentration camp death factory
- Frankfurt Auschwitz Trials, 1963–1965
- Majdanek Trials, held against Majdanek extermination camp officials. Longest Nazi war crimes trial in history, spanning over 30 years
- Chełmno Trials of the Chełmno extermination camp personnel, held in Poland and Germany. The cases were decided almost twenty years apart
- Sobibor Trial held in Hagen, Germany in 1965, concerning the Sobibor extermination camp
- Belzec Trial before the 1st Munich District Court in the mid-1960s, eight SS-men of the Belzec extermination camp
- Belsen Trial in Lüneburg, 1945
- Dachau Trials held within the walls of the former Dachau concentration camp, 1945–1948
- Mauthausen-Gusen camp trials, 1946–47
- Ravensbrück Trial, 1946–48
