= William C. Christianson =

American judge (1892–1985)

William Christianson

Associate Justice of the Minnesota Supreme Court
- In office March 1946 – January 1947
- Appointed by: Edward John Thye
- Preceded by: Luther Youngdahl

Personal details
- Born: William Christian Christianson; December 5, 1892 Moody County, South Dakota, U.S.
- Died: May 27, 1985 (aged 92) Red Wing, Minnesota, U.S.
- Education: Highland Park College (BA); University of Chicago (JD)

William Christian Christianson (December 5, 1892 – May 27, 1985) was an American jurist. He was one of the judges at the Nuremberg Military Tribunals.

== Early life and education ==
Christianson was born in Moody County, South Dakota. He was the son of Christian O. Christianson (1857–1937) and Karen (Holter) Christianson (1862–1936). Christianson went to school in Austin, Minnesota, and Jasper, Minnesota. He earned a bachelor's degree from Highland Park College and then received his J.D. degree from University of Chicago Law School in 1920.

== Career ==
Christianson was assistant county attorney for Goodhue County, Minnesota and Red Wing, Minnesota city attorney. Christianson served on the Minnesota Supreme Court from March 1946 to January 1947. In 1948 and 1949, Christianson was one of the judges of the Subsequent Nuremberg trials. In 1949, Christianson was appointed a Minnesota District Court judge for the first district and served until his retirement in 1963.

== Personal life ==
Christianson was married to Myrtle Lorenz who died in 1977. Christianson died in Red Wing, Minnesota, in 1985. He was buried at Oakwood Cemetery in Goodhue County, Minnesota.
