= Rudolf Lehmann (military judge) =

German jurist and military judge (1890–1955)

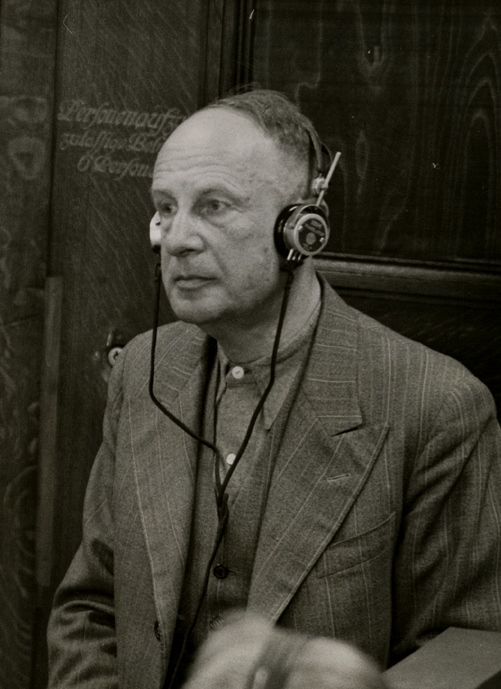
- Lehmann at the Nuremberg Trials, 1947
- Born: 11 December 1890; Posen, Province of Posen, German Empire
- Died: 26 July 1955 (aged 64); Bonn, West Germany
- Military career
- Allegiance: German Empire (to 1918); Nazi Germany
- Branch: Army
- Service years: 1914–1918, 1938–1945
- Rank: Generaloberstabsrichter (highest general rank for a Judge Advocate, like a General of the branch, today OF-8)
- Commands: Judge Advocate General of the German Armed Forces
- Conflicts: World War I World War II

Rudolf Lehmann (11 December 1890 – 26 July 1955) was a German jurist and military judge who was the Judge Advocate General of the Wehrmacht in World War II. Lehmann was found guilty of war crimes at the High Command Trial at Nuremberg in 1948. He had close ties with Nazi Germany, but was not a member of the Nazi Party.

== Career ==
Lehmann's father was a professor of law. He grew up in Breslau and Hanau, studied law in Munich, Freiburg, Leipzig and Marburg and qualified as a lawyer before service as a reserve officer in the Imperial Army in World War I, during which he was awarded the Iron Cross. After the war he returned to Marburg University where he was awarded a doctorate in jurisprudence. He then entered government service as a prosecutor and worked at the Reich Justice Ministry.

Lehmann entered the Army Legal Service in October 1937 and from July 1938 to May 1945 was head of the Legal Department. In this role he assessed the charges against Generaloberst Werner von Fritsch between February and March 1938 and his judgement was for an acquittal. On 1 May 1944 he was given the unique rank of Generaloberstabsrichter which was equivalent to General of the branch but outside the normal chain of command. He was taken into captivity in May 1945 and held in a US Army Prisoner of War Camp.

== Nuremberg trials ==
Lehmann was found guilty of war crimes at the Nuremberg High Command Trial in October 1947 for involvement in drafting the Barbarossa decree and the Commissar Order that stipulated that any captured Soviet political commissar was to be executed, contrary to international law. He was sentenced to seven years imprisonment but was released from Landsberg Prison on 16 August 1950. He then lived in Bad Godesberg, where he was Managing Director of the mining trade association. He died in Bonn aged 64.
