= Werner Milch =

German lawyer (1903–1984)

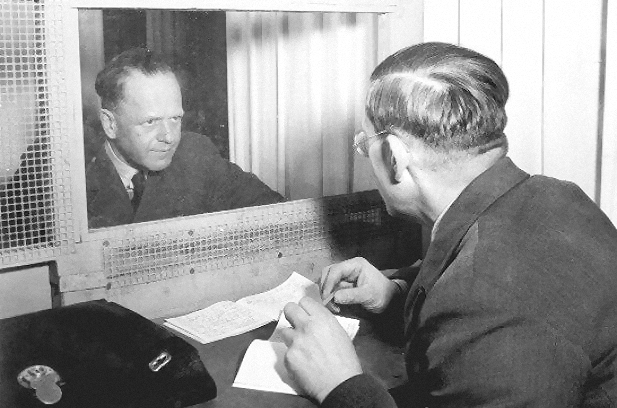
- Werner Milch, back to camera, confers with his brother and client Erhard Milch, during the latter's trial at Nuremberg.
- Born: 15 November 1903
- Died: 17 November 1984 (aged 81)
- Occupation: Lawyer
- Relatives: Erhard Milch (brother)
- Awards: Knight's Cross of the Iron Cross

Werner Milch (15 November 1903 – 17 November 1984) was a German lawyer.

Milch was born in Wilhelmshaven, the son of Anton Milch, a Jewish pharmacist who served in the Imperial German Navy, and Clara, née Vetter.

During World War II, he served in the Wehrmacht and was a recipient of the Knight's Cross of the Iron Cross of Nazi Germany.

After the war, he acted as co-counsel, alongside Friedrich Bergold, for his brother, ex-field marshal Erhard Milch, in the Milch Trial.

== World War II awards ==
- German Cross in Gold on 15 April 1944 as Hauptmann in the Stab II./Fallschirm-Artillerie-Regiment 2
- Knight's Cross of the Iron Cross on 9 January 1945 as Hauptmann and commander of Fallschirm-Granatwerfer-Lehr- und Ausbildungs-Battalion
