= Erhard Milch =

German general (1892–1972)

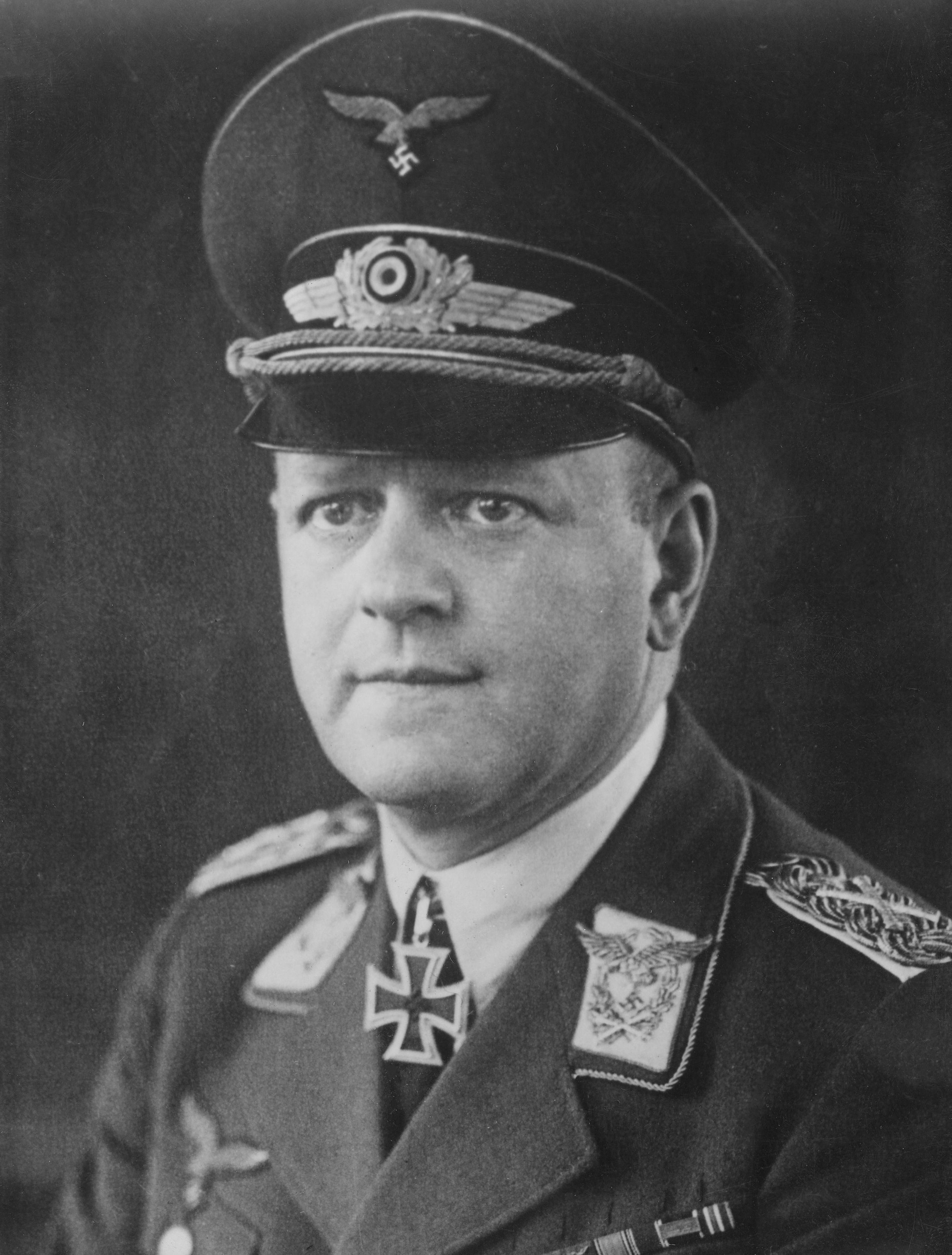
- Milch in 1942
- Born: 30 March 1892; Wilhelmshaven, Grand Duchy of Oldenburg, German Empire
- Died: 25 January 1972 (aged 79); Düsseldorf, North Rhine-Westphalia, West Germany
- Relatives: Werner Milch (brother)
- Military career
- Allegiance: German Empire; Weimar Republic; Nazi Germany
- Branch: Imperial German Army; Luftstreitkräfte; Luftwaffe
- Service years: 1910–1922; 1933–1945
- Rank: Generalfeldmarschall
- Commands: Luftflotte 5 Jägerstab
- Conflicts: World War I; World War II; Battle of Britain; Norwegian campaign
- Awards: Knight's Cross of the Iron Cross

Erhard Milch (30 March 1892 – 25 January 1972) was a German Generalfeldmarschall of the Luftwaffe who oversaw its founding and development during the rearmament of Germany and most of World War II. Milch served as State Secretary in the Reich Ministry of Aviation from May 1933 to June 1944 and as Inspector General of the Luftwaffe from February 1939 to January 1945.

Milch was an early member of the Luftstreitkräfte during World War I and worked as an airline director in the German civil aviation industry after the war. Milch was appointed deputy of Hermann Göring in the Aviation Ministry in 1933, heading the organisation and development of the Luftwaffe from 1936. Milch led Nazi Germany's aircraft production and supply from 1941, adopting a policy of mass production, and utilising the forced labour of foreign workers under inhumane conditions to supply the Luftwaffe. Milch was removed from his important Aviation Ministry positions after supporting a failed attempt to remove Göring in June 1944 and sidelined until his capture by Allied forces in May 1945.

Milch was tried at the Milch Trial in 1947, convicted of war crimes and crimes against humanity for his exploitation of forced labour for the Luftwaffe, and sentenced to life imprisonment. Milch's sentence was commuted to 15 years by John J. McCloy, the U. S. High Commissioner for Germany, in 1951. Milch was paroled in 1954 and died in West Germany in 1972.

== Early life ==
Erhard Milch was born on 30 March 1892 in Wilhelmshaven, the son of Anton Milch, a pharmacist in the Imperial German Navy, and his wife Clara Wilhelmine (née Vetter). Anton had converted from Judaism which made Milch a Mischling (mixed-race) under the Nuremberg Laws. However, he would not have been considered Jewish according to Jewish orthodoxy (or halakha), which states that a person’s Jewish status is passed down through the mother. The Gestapo began to investigate Milch's alleged Jewish heritage in 1935 after rumours began to circulate. The investigation was halted by Hermann Göring, the commander-in-chief of the Luftwaffe, who produced an affidavit by Milch's mother stating that his biological father was her uncle, Karl Brauer, meaning he was a product of incest but not a Mischling. Milch was then issued with a German Blood Certificate though his legal paternity was never changed. Those events and the later extension of the "Certificate of German Blood" were the background to Göring's statement "I decide who is a Jew in the air force".

Author and historian David Irving claimed in his book The Rise and Fall of the Luftwaffe: The Life of Field Marshal Erhard Milch that Milch asked him not to reveal the truth about his parentage, so although Irving states that Erhard's father was not Anton Milch and concentrates on his wealthy great-uncle Karl Brauer (who died in 1906), he does not actually name Brauer as his father. However, Irving, who claimed to have had access to the Field Marshal's private diary and papers, says the rumours about Milch's parentage began to spread in the autumn of 1933, and that Erhard Milch personally obtained a signed statement by his putative father Anton that he was not the father of Clara's children. Furthermore, Irving claimed that Clara Milch had already written to her son-in-law Fritz Herrmann in March 1933 explaining the circumstances of her marriage, and that Göring had initiated his own investigation that identified his real father. During the Nuremberg trials in 1946, Milch was again questioned about his alleged Jewish father and Göring's role in the matter by Chief United States Prosecutor Robert H. Jackson.

== World War I and interwar career ==
Milch enlisted in the Imperial German Army in 1910, where he rose to the rank of Leutnant and commanded an artillery unit in East Prussia at the beginning of World War I. In September 1914, he saw action against the Imperial Russian Army on the River Deime and in February 1915 on the Angerapp Line. In July 1915, he was transferred to the Fliegertruppe and trained as an aerial observer on the Western Front, seeing action on the Somme in 1916 (through the period of it becoming the Luftstreitkräfte in October that year) and later in Flanders during 1917. After a spell as a company commander in the trenches in the spring and summer of 1918, in the waning days of the war, he was promoted to Hauptmann and appointed to command a fighter wing, Jagdgruppe 6, even though he had never trained as a pilot and could not fly himself.

Milch resigned from the Reichswehr in 1920 to pursue a career in civil aviation as a result of Germany being forbidden from maintaining an air force in the Treaty of Versailles. Milch formed a small airline Lloyd Luftdienst, under the banner of Norddeutscher Lloyd's union of regional German airlines, with squadron colleague Gotthard Sachsenberg in Danzig. The airline linked Danzig to the Baltic States. In 1923, Milch became the managing director of its successor company. From there, Milch and Sachsenberg went to work for rival Junkers Luftverkehr, where Milch was appointed a managing director in 1925. Milch was named a managing director (one of three) of the newly-formed airline Deutsche Luft Hansa in 1926. Milch joined the Nazi Party (membership number 123,885) on 1 April 1929, but his membership was not officially acknowledged until March 1933, because Adolf Hitler deemed it desirable to keep the fact hidden for political reasons.

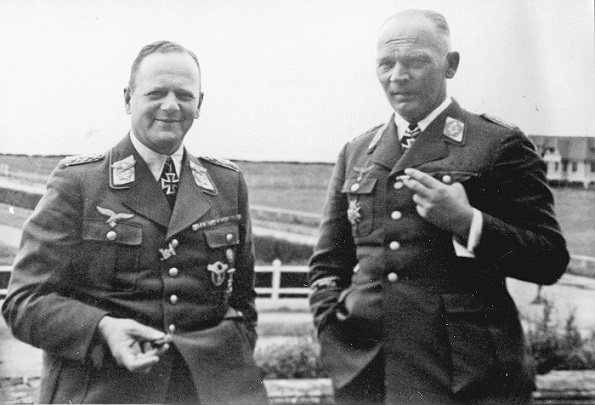
Milch with Wolfram von Richthofen in 1940.

On 5 May 1933, Milch took up a position as State Secretary of the newly formed Reich Ministry of Aviation (RLM), answering directly to Göring. In this capacity, he was instrumental in establishing the Luftwaffe, the air force of Nazi Germany. Milch quickly used his position to settle personal scores with other aviation industry personalities, including Hugo Junkers and Willy Messerschmitt. Specifically, Milch banned Messerschmitt from submitting a design in the competition for a new fighter aircraft for the Luftwaffe. However, Messerschmitt outmanoeuvred Milch, circumventing the ban and successfully submitting the Bf 109 design under the corporate name Bayerische Flugzeugwerke, which proved to be the winner. Messerschmitt maintained its leading position within the German aircraft industry until the failure of the Me 210 aircraft. Even after that, Milch did not depose him, but put him in an inferior position.

== World War II ==
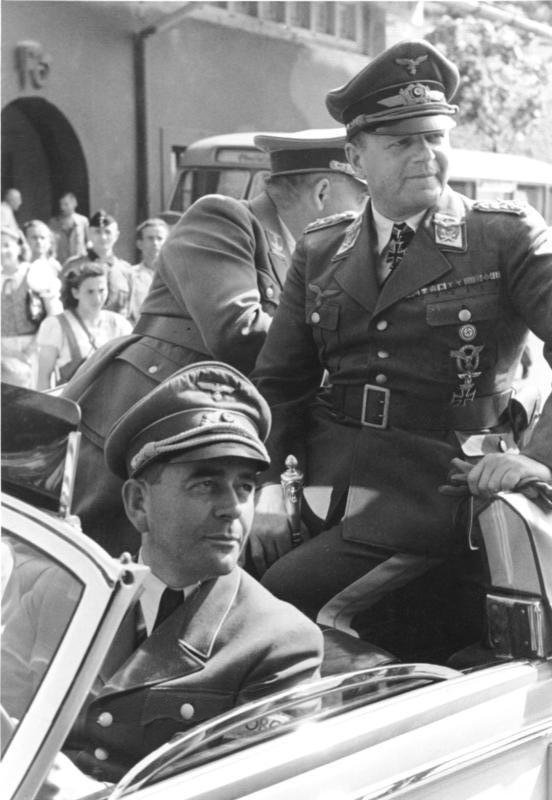
Albert Speer (front) and Erhard Milch (back) during a visit to an armaments factory.

In a reorganization of 1 February 1939, Milch with the rank of Generaloberst was given the additional job of Inspector-General of the Luftwaffe. After the outbreak of World War II in September, Milch commanded Luftflotte 5 during Operation Weserübung in Norway. Following the defeat of France, Milch was promoted to Generalfeldmarschall (field marshal) during the 1940 Field Marshal Ceremony. Following the suicide of the Luftwaffe's research and development chief Ernst Udet in November 1941, Milch succeeded him as Generalluftzeugmeister, in charge of all Luftwaffe aircraft production, armament and supply. In April 1942, he was named to the Central Planning Board along with Albert Speer (Reich Minister of Armaments and War Production), Paul Körner (State Secretary of the Four Year Plan), and Walther Funk (Reich Minister for the Economy) in an effort to coordinate control over all industrial war production.

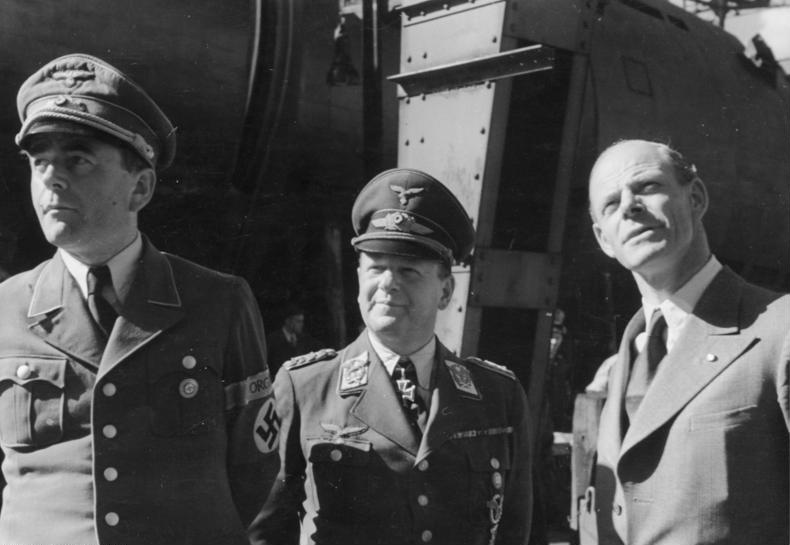
Milch (centre) with Minister of Armaments Albert Speer (left) and aircraft designer Willy Messerschmitt (right)

Milch cancelled production of the ineffective and dangerous Messerschmitt Me 210 and Heinkel He 177, and put them back in development. Under his direction, the Luftwaffe's aircraft production focused on mass production of the tested and tried models. Output doubled in the summer of 1943 in comparison with the winter of 1941–1942. Adam Tooze wrote "For the first time, the German aircraft industry was able to achieve substantial economies of scale. The resources pumped into the Luftwaffe in 1940–41 were now concentrated in mass assembly". To achieve this level of mass production, the Armaments Ministries and the industry cooperated with the SS to procure forced labour from the Nazi concentration camps. Due to Milch's connections with the SS, the Luftwaffe had an advantage in obtaining forced labour over the other armed forces. To increase the quantity, Milch also made some sacrifices in quality, notable in the case of the Messerschmitt Bf 109. When the United States Army Air Forces began to directly challenge the fighter forces of the Luftwaffe, the cost of Milch's decisions was shown as the handling of the Bf 109 G was so bad that they became, in the words of Tooze, "little more than death traps".

In January 1943, Milch was tasked by Hitler with ensuring the air supply of the 6th Army, which was encircled at the Battle of Stalingrad. Hitler valued Milch's organizational talent and the task required him to travel to the front line for the first time in the war. He found the situation to be impossible: there were too few aircrew, too little fuel and, in particular, no suitable airfields or landing sites within reach of Stalingrad. By this time, Milch had passed the peak of his career with the increasingly intense Allied air raids on German territory from the summer of 1943 onward, and the resulting loss of air supremacy ultimately led to a loss of confidence from Göring and Hitler.

On 10 August 1943, Milch finally addressed Germany's lack of a truly "four-engined" heavy bomber to carry out raids against the United Kingdom. He endorsed Arado Flugzeugwerke to be the subcontractor for the Heinkel He 177B separately engined heavy bomber design. Only three flyable prototypes were completed by early 1944. From March 1944, Milch, together with Speer, oversaw the activities of the Jägerstab ("Fighter Staff"), a governmental task force whose aim was to increase the production of fighter aircraft, in part by moving the production facilities underground. In cooperation with the SS, the task force played a key role in the exploitation of forced labour for the benefit of the German aircraft industry and the Luftwaffe.

When the agitation among the legions of foreign workers in his factories threatened production, Milch was able to refer to his association with Reichsführer-SS Heinrich Himmler:

I spoke to Himmler recently about this, and told him his main task must be to see to the protection of German industry if unrest breaks out among this foreign scum.

If, for instance, there is a mutiny at X, an officer with a couple of men, or a lieutenant with thirty troops, must appear in the factory and let fly with their machine-guns into the mob. The object is to lay out as many people as possible, if mutinies break out. This is the order I have issued, even if the people are our own foreign workers.

Every tenth man is to be picked out, and every tenth man will be shot in front of the rest.

Milch's loss of power within the Aviation Ministry intensified when, in early 1944, Milch was forced to hand over fighter production, the bulk of German air armament, to the Jägerstab after the devastating Big Week on German cities and military targets.

In June 1944, Milch sided with Himmler and Joseph Goebbels, the propaganda minister, in attempting to convince Hitler to remove Göring from command of the Luftwaffe. When Hitler refused, Göring retaliated by forcing Milch out of his positions as State Secretary and Generalluftzeugmeister on 20 June, and eventually as Luftwaffe Inspector General in January 1945. From August 1944, Milch worked under Speer in the Rüstungsstab (Armaments Staff) as his deputy, but was sidelined and achieved little. He was injured in a car accident in the fall of 1944 and hospitalized for several weeks. Finally placed into the Führerreserve in March 1945, he was not reassigned for the remainder of the war.

=== Capture and assault ===
On 4 May 1945, Milch was apprehended by the British No. 6 Commando on the Baltic Sea coast and taken to the unit's command post of Brigadier Derek Mills-Roberts in Neustadt in Holstein, a man who was known to have a short temper. When Milch arrived, Mills-Roberts was said to be still seething from the suffering and atrocities he had seen during the liberation of Bergen-Belsen concentration camp. Milch reportedly addressed Mills-Roberts in a haughty manner, demanding good treatment, waving his Generalfeldmarschall's campaign baton around, and dismissing concerns about the inmates of several satellite Arbeitslager of Neuengamme concentration camp in the area. Mills-Roberts became so incensed with Milch's tone, the British officer snatched the field-marshal's baton from him and began beating Milch over the head with it until it broke. He then grabbed a champagne bottle and continued, fracturing Milch's skull. The bloodied field-marshal was then pulled up from the floor and driven back to Sierhagen Castle where he had been staying, and robbed at gunpoint by British soldiers (which included his ceremonial jewel-encrusted Generalfeldmarschall baton). He was then sent to a holding camp for Nazi prisoners at Lüneburg near the field HQ of British Field Marshal Bernard Montgomery.

A few days later Mills-Roberts went to the British HQ and, upon entering the commander's tent, Montgomery is said to have covered his head with his hands, quipping "I hear you've got a thing about Field Marshals". Mills-Roberts apologised for his actions but no further action was taken against him.

== Trial and conviction at Nuremberg ==
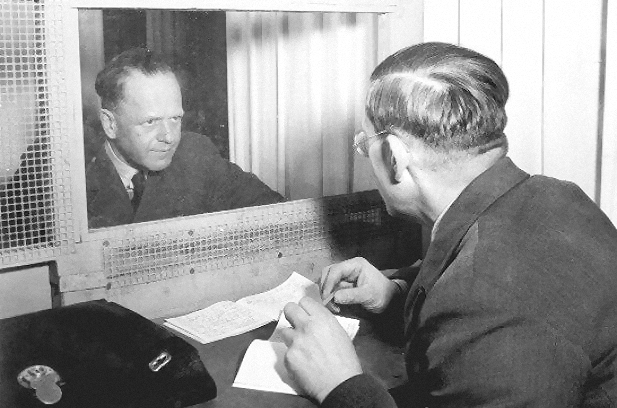
Erhard Milch, facing camera, confers with his brother and defense lawyer, Dr. Werner Milch, in the special consulting room provided for defendants on trial at Nuremberg.

Milch was tried as a war criminal in 1947 by a United States Military Tribunal in Nuremberg for his widespread use of forced labour in the Luftwaffe's production. His defence was represented by his brother Werner Milch. He was convicted on two counts:

1. War crimes, by participating in the ill treatment and use of the forced labour of prisoners of war (POWs) and the deportation of civilians to the same ends.
2. Crimes against humanity, by participating in the murder, extermination, enslavement, deportation, imprisonment, torture, and the use of slave labour of civilians who came under German control, German nationals and prisoners of war.

Milch was sentenced to life imprisonment and sent to Rebdorf Prison near Munich. Unlike the vast majority of other Nazi war criminals who were tried under U.S. military law, Milch was not immediately sent to Landsberg Prison to serve his sentence, but was eventually transferred to Landsberg. Milch's sentence was commuted to 15 years imprisonment in 1951, and he was paroled in June 1954. He lived out the remainder of his life in Düsseldorf, where he died in 1972 as the last living Generalfeldmarschall of the Luftwaffe.

== Popular culture ==
In the 1969 film Battle of Britain, Milch was portrayed by German actor Dietrich Frauboes.

American actor Robert Vaughn portrayed Milch in the 1982 television film, Inside the Third Reich.

== Awards ==
- Knight's Cross of the Iron Cross on 4 May 1940 as Generaloberst and chief of Luftflotte 5 and Befehlshaber Nord (commander-in-chief north).
- Grand Cross with Swords of the Order of the White Rose of Finland on 30 March 1942 as Generalfeldmarschall.

== Bibliography ==
- Angolia, John R. (1976). For Führer and Fatherland: Military Awards of the Third Reich. R. James Bender. pp. 351–7. ISBN 978-0912138145.
- Boog, Horst (1994). "Milch, Erhard". Neue Deutsche Biographie (in German). Vol. 17. pp. 499–503.
- Brett-Smith, Richard (1976). Hitler's Generals. San Rafael, CA: Presidio Press. ISBN 0-89141-044-9.
- Buggeln, Marc (2014). Slave Labor in Nazi Concentration Camps. Oxford University Press. ISBN 9780198707974.
- Faber, Harold (1977). Luftwaffe: A History. New York: Times Books. ISBN 0-8129-0725-6.
- Franks, Norman L. R.; Bailey, Frank W.; Guest, Russell (1993). Above the Lines: The Aces and Fighter Units of the German Air Service, Naval Air Service and Flanders Marine Corps, 1914–1918. London: Grub Street. ISBN 0948817739.
- Griehl, Manfred; Dressel, Joachim (1998). Heinkel He 177-277-274. Shrewsbury, UK: Airlife Publishing. ISBN 1-85310-364-0.
- Matikkala, Antti (2017). Kunnian ruletti: Korkeimmat ulkomaalaisille 1941–1944 annetut suomalaiset kunniamerkit [The Roulette of Honour: The Highest Finnish Orders to Foreigners 1941–1944] (in Finnish). Helsinki: Suomalaisen Kirjallisuuden Seura. ISBN 978-952-222-847-5.
- Rigg, Bryan Mark (2002). Hitler's Jewish Soldiers: The Untold Story of Nazi Racial Laws and Men of Jewish Descent in the German Military. Lawrence: University Press of Kansas. ISBN 978-0700613588.
- Scherzer, Veit (2007). Die Ritterkreuzträger 1939–1945 Die Inhaber des Ritterkreuzes des Eisernen Kreuzes 1939 von Heer, Luftwaffe, Kriegsmarine, Waffen-SS, Volkssturm sowie mit Deutschland verbündeter Streitkräfte nach den Unterlagen des Bundesarchives [The Knight's Cross Bearers 1939–1945 The Holders of the Knight's Cross of the Iron Cross 1939 by Army, Air Force, Navy, Waffen-SS, Volkssturm and Allied Forces with Germany According to the Documents of the Federal Archives] (in German). Jena, Germany: Scherzers Militaer-Verlag. ISBN 978-3-938845-17-2.

Military offices
Preceded by none	Commander of Luftflotte 5; 12 April 1940 – 10 May 1940	Succeeded by Generaloberst Hans-Jürgen Stumpff
