= Telford Taylor =

American lawyer (1908–1998)

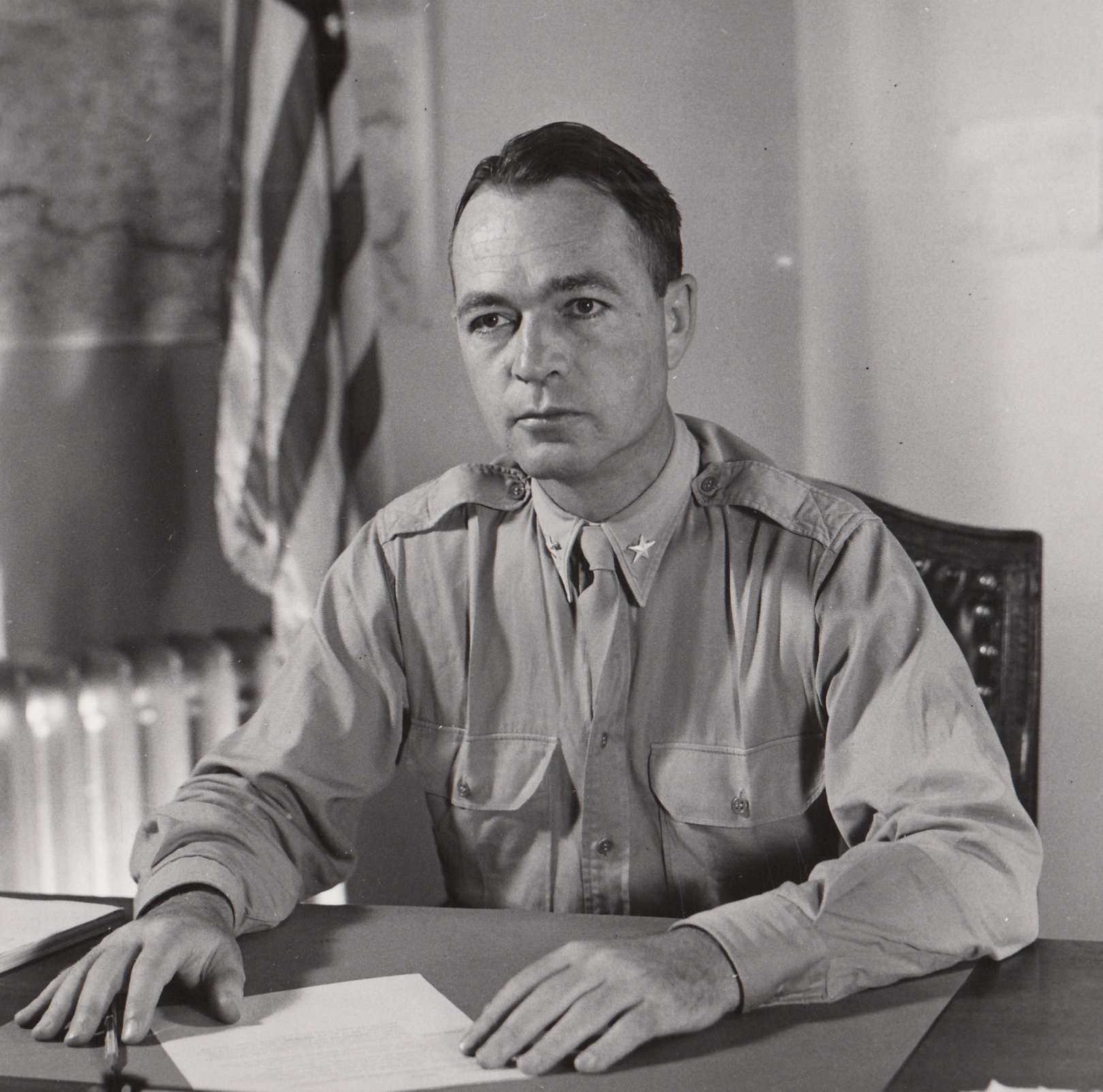
- Taylor in the 1940s
- Born: February 24, 1908; Schenectady, New York, U.S.
- Died: May 23, 1998 (aged 90); Manhattan, New York, U.S.
- Burial place: Morningside Cemetery; Gaylordsville, Connecticut
- Military career
- Allegiance: United States of America
- Branch: United States Army
- Service years: 1942–1949
- Rank: Brigadier General
- Service number: 0-918566
- Conflicts: World War II
- Awards: Distinguished Service Medal
- Other work: Lawyer, college professor

Telford Taylor (February 24, 1908 – May 23, 1998) was an American lawyer and professor. Taylor was known for his role as lead counsel in the prosecution of war criminals after World War II, his opposition to McCarthyism in the 1950s, and his outspoken criticism of American actions during the Vietnam War.

With the US Army, Taylor served with the Military Intelligence Corps during WWII. He reached the rank of brigadier general in 1946, following the war. During the prosecution of Axis war criminals, he served as lead counsel for the prosecution in the 12 subsequent Nuremberg trials before US military courts, after serving as assistant to Robert H. Jackson in the initial trial before the International Military Tribunal.

Following the Nuremberg trials, Taylor opened a private law practice, but remained politically active.

== Background ==
Taylor was born on February 24, 1908, in Schenectady, New York. His parents were John Bellamy Taylor (a relative of Edward Bellamy) and Marcia Estabrook Jones. He attended Williams College and Harvard Law School, where he received his law degree in 1932.

== Career ==
=== Early career ===
During the 1930s, Taylor worked for several government agencies. By 1935, he provided legal counsel (assisted by Max Lowenthal among others) to a subcommittee of the Senate Interstate Commerce Committee chaired by Burton K. Wheeler and whose members included the newly elected Harry S. Truman. In 1940, he became general counsel for the Federal Communications Commission.

=== World War II and Nuremberg ===
Telford Taylor's opening address at the Judges' trial

Following the outbreak of World War II, Taylor joined Army Intelligence as a major on October 5, 1942, leading the American group at Bletchley Park that was responsible for analyzing information obtained from intercepted German communications using Ultra decryption. He was promoted to lieutenant colonel in 1943 and visited England, where he helped negotiate the 1943 BRUSA Agreement. In 1944, he was promoted to full colonel and was assigned to the team of Robert H. Jackson, which helped work out the London Charter of the International Military Tribunal, the legal basis for the Nuremberg trials.

At the Nuremberg trials, Taylor initially served as an assistant to chief counsel Robert H. Jackson and, in that function, was the U.S. prosecutor in the High Command case. The indictment in that case called for the General Staff of the Army and the High Command of the German Armed Forces to be considered criminal organizations; the witnesses were several of the surviving German field marshals. Both organizations were acquitted.

When Jackson resigned his position as prosecutor after the first (and only) trial before the IMT and returned to the US, Taylor was promoted to brigadier general and succeeded him on October 17, 1946, as chief counsel for the remaining twelve trials before the US Nuremberg Military Tribunals. In these trials at Nuremberg, 163 of the 200 defendants who were tried were found guilty in some or all of the charges of the indictments.

While Taylor was not wholly satisfied with the outcomes of the Nuremberg trials, he considered them a success because they set a precedent and defined a legal base for crimes against peace and humanity. In 1950, the United Nations codified the most important statements from these trials in the seven Nuremberg principles.

Telford Taylor advised William L. Shirer in the late 1950s when Shirer was writing The Rise and Fall of the Third Reich, loaning documents and books from his personal collection. Shirer's monumental history of Nazi Germany became a surprise best-seller when it was published by Simon & Schuster in 1960, and has remained in print ever since.

=== McCarthyism and Vietnam ===
After the Nuremberg trials, Taylor returned to civilian life in the United States, opening a private law practice in New York City. He became increasingly concerned with Senator Joseph McCarthy's activities, which he criticized strongly. In a speech at West Point in 1953, he called McCarthy "a dangerous adventurer," branded his tactics "a vicious weapon of the extreme right against their political opponents," and criticized President Dwight Eisenhower for not stopping McCarthy's "shameful abuse of Congressional investigatory power." He defended several victims of McCarthyism, alleged communists or perjurers, including labor leader Harry Bridges and Junius Scales. Although he lost these two cases (Bridges' sentence of five years in prison was later voided by the Supreme Court, and Scales' six-year sentence was commuted after one year), he remained unfazed by McCarthy's attacks on him, and responded by writing the book, Grand Inquest: The Story of Congressional Investigations, which was published in 1955.

In 1959, he served as a technical advisor and narrator on the television production Judgment at Nuremberg.

In 1961 Taylor attended the Eichmann trial in Israel as a semiofficial observer and expressed concerns about the trial being held on a defective statute, citing international justice and ethical issues.

Taylor became a full professor at Columbia University in 1962, where he would be named Nash Professor of Law in 1974. In 1966, he was elected a Fellow of the American Academy of Arts and Sciences. He was one of very few professors there who refused to sign a statement issued by the Columbia Law School that termed the militant student protests at Columbia in 1968 as being beyond the "allowable limits" of civil disobedience. Taylor was very critical of the conduct of US troops in the Vietnam War, and in 1971 urged President Richard Nixon to set up a national commission to investigate the conflict. He strongly criticized the court-martial of Lieutenant William Calley, the commanding officer of the US troops involved in the My Lai massacre because it did not include higher-ranking officers.

Taylor regarded the 1972 bombing campaign targeting the North Vietnamese capital, Hanoi, as "senseless and immoral." He offered to describe and explain his views to CBS, but the network declined to air them because they considered them "too hot to handle.". In December 1972, he visited Hanoi along with musician and activist Joan Baez and others, among them was Michael Allen, the associate dean of the Yale Divinity School.

Taylor published his views in a book, Nuremberg and Vietnam: An American Tragedy, in 1970. He argued that by the standards employed at the Nuremberg trials, U.S. conduct in Vietnam and Cambodia, while different in some ways, was as criminal as that of the Nazis during World War II. For that reason, he favored prosecuting US aviators who had participated in bombing missions over North Vietnam. Shortly after the end of the Vietnam War, Taylor said over the past few decades since World War II, some of his historical views had changed. His views on Germany had not changed, but they had on the United States.

"Most of these things are not done by monsters. They're done by very ordinary people, people very much like you and me. These things are results of pressures and circumstances to which human frailty succumbs. And a large part of it isn't really due to any intrinsic sadism or a desire to inflict pain - it's the degeneration of standards under pressures, boredom, fear, other influences of this kind. Well, I guess that I did think before that Americans, in their history, had been somewhat more immune to these pressures and that the historical record was a better one. The moral standards we tried to attain in peace and war were higher. I guess I still think we try to attain the higher values; but, yes, and succeed sometimes - succeed less often, I guess, than I thought before." "Since I read Bury My Heart at Wounded Knee and I guess it was born in upon me that these things had happened before. The feeling that I'd had for a long time that these things didn't go on in the American armed forces, alas, it isn't so. They sometimes do."

=== Later life ===
Taylor in retirement

In 1976, Taylor, who had already been a visiting professor at Harvard and Yale Law School, accepted a new post at the Benjamin N. Cardozo School of Law at Yeshiva University, becoming a founding member of the faculty while continuing to teach at Columbia. His 1979 book, Munich: The Price of Peace, won the National Book Critics Circle Award for the "best work of general nonfiction". In the 1980s, he extended his legal activities into sports and became a "special master" for dispute resolution in the NBA.

Taylor retired in 1994.

== Personal life and death ==
Taylor married twice; first to Mary Ellen Walker in 1937. He was survived by their three children, Joan, Ellen, and John.

While serving at Bletchley Park, he had an affair with Christine Brooke-Rose, who later became a writer and critic but was then a British officer at Bletchley. The affair led to the end of Brooke-Rose's marriage, although Taylor's to Walker endured for some years thereafter.

In 1974 he married Toby Golick, having two children who both survived him, Benjamin and Samuel.

Taylor also had one child, Ursula Rechnagel, with Julie Rechnagel, both of whom also survived him.

He died at age 90 on May 23, 1998, at St. Luke's-Roosevelt Hospital in Manhattan, after suffering a stroke.

== Decorations ==
Here is the list of his decorations:

Army Distinguished Service Medal
American Campaign Medal
European-African-Middle Eastern Campaign Medal
World War II Victory Medal
Army of Occupation Medal
Officer of the Most Excellent Order of the British Empire

== General references ==
- Severo, Richard (May 24, 1998). "Telford Taylor, Who Prosecuted Top Nazis at the Nuremberg War Trials, Is Dead at 90". The New York Times.
- Ferencz, B. (November 1, 1998). "Telford Taylor: Pioneer of International Criminal Law". Columbia Journal of Transnational Law. 37 (3). Archived from the original on December 23, 2004.
- Rudenstine, David (1998). "Telford Taylor". Cardozo School of Law. Yeshiva University. Archived from the original on August 20, 2008.

== Sources ==
- Sword and Swastika: Generals and Nazis in the Third Reich, Simon & Schuster 1952; reprinted 1980. ISBN 0-8446-0934-X
- Grand Inquest: The Story of Congressional Investigations, Simon & Schuster 1955; reprinted 1974. ISBN 0-306-70620-2
- The March of Conquest: The German Victories in Western Europe, 1940 (Great War Stories), Simon & Schuster 1958; reprinted 1991. ISBN 0-933852-94-0
- The Breaking Wave: The Second World War in the Summer of 1940, Simon & Schuster 1967; ISBN 0-671-10366-0
- Guilt, Responsibility and the Third Reich, Heffer 1970; 20 pages; ISBN 0-85270-044-X
- Nuremberg and Vietnam: An American Tragedy, Times Books 1970; ISBN 0-8129-0210-6
- (with Constance Baker Motley & James Feibleman) Perspectives on Justice, Northwestern University Press 1974; ISBN 0-8101-0453-9
- Courts of Terror: Soviet Criminal Justice and Jewish Emigration, Knopf 1976; ISBN 0-394-40509-9
- Munich: The Price of Peace, Hodder & Staughton 1979; reprinted 1989. ISBN 0-88184-447-0
- The Anatomy of the Nuremberg Trials: A Personal Memoir, Knopf 1992; ISBN 0-394-58355-8
- Shirer, William Lawrence (1960), The Rise and Fall of the Third Reich: A History of Nazi Germany, New York City: Simon & Schuster, ASIN B0766DKDLR, LCCN 60006729, OCLC 1286630, OL 5794925M, Wikidata Q138029595
