= Strasser =

Strasser is a German surname. Notable people with the surname include:

- Adolph Strasser (1843–1939), American trade union organizer
- Alfred Strasser (born 1954), Swiss footballer
- Anna Strasser (1921–2010), Austrian resistance activist
- Benjamin Strasser (born 1987), German politician (FDP)
- Bernd Strasser (1936–2025), German water polo player
- Chantal Strasser (born 1978), Swiss freestyle swimmer
- Christoph Strasser (born 1982), Austrian ultra cyclist
- Dave Strasser (born 1969), American mixed martial arts fighter
- Erika Strasser (1934–2019), Austrian athlete
- Ernst Strasser (born 1956), Austrian politician
- Evi Strasser (born 1964), Canadian equestrian
- Franz Strasser (1899–1945), Austrian-German politician and war criminal
- Friedrich Strasser, Austrian painter
- Georg Strasser (1891–1925), German aviator
- Georg Strasser (politician) (born 1971), Austrian politician
- Gregor Strasser (1892–1934), German Nazi Party leader
- Heinrich Strasser (born 1948), Austrian footballer
- Hiltrud Strasser (born 1943), German veterinarian
- Hugo Strasser (1922-2016), German jazz musician
- Jeff Strasser (born 1974), Luxembourgish football player
- Jonathan Strasser (1946–2017), American musician, educator, teacher, and conductor
- Joseph C. Strasser (1940–2019), United States Navy admiral
- Leopold Strasser (1843–1908), American merchant, politician
- Max Strasser (1904–1967), Swiss footballer
- Otto Strasser (1897–1974), German Nazi Party leader and exiled activist
- Peter Strasser (1876–1918), Imperial German Navy officer, commander of the German naval Zeppelin fleet in World War I
- Peter Strasser (born 1969), German chemist
- Peter G. Strasser, American attorney
- Pirmin Strasser (born 1990), Austrian footballer
- Raymond Strasser (born 1930), Luxembourgish wrestler
- Robin Strasser (born 1945), American actress
- Rodney Strasser (born 1990), Sierra Leonean footballer
- Sarah Strasser, physician and rural health specialist
- Teresa Strasser (born 1970), American journalist and television personality
- Todd Strasser (born 1950), American writer
- Valentine Strasser (born 1967), Sierra Leonean politician

== See also ==
- Strasserism, "left"-wing Nazi faction
- Strasser brothers, 1930s Nazi Party activists
- Strasser Scheme, British aviation initiative created by Charles Strasser
