= Council of Ministers for the Defense of the Reich =

Nazi German ministerial council

The Council of Ministers for the Defense of the Reich (German: Ministerrat für die Reichsverteidigung) was a six-member ministerial council created in Nazi Germany by Adolf Hitler on 30 August 1939, in anticipation of the invasion of Poland – which provoked the beginning of World War II – with the purpose of allowing the continuation of the Nazi government, especially in relation to the war effort, while Hitler concentrated on prosecuting the war. The council has been described as functioning as a "war cabinet," although this assessment is disputed.

This institution should not be confused with the Reich Defense Council (Reichsverteidungsrat), which was established in 1938 and met only two times.

== Background ==
Immediately before his planned invasion of Poland, Adolf Hitler, the Führer and Reich Chancellor of Nazi Germany, anticipated spending an increasing amount of time prosecuting the war, to the detriment of his domestic duties. This would be a problem because the Enabling Act of 1933 had transformed what had been the democratic Weimar Republic into a totalitarian dictatorship in which all "legislation" was done by decrees which required Hitler's signature. A solution was needed to allow the domestic affairs of the country – at least as far as they involved the war effort – to continue. Thus a decree was issued on 30 August 1939 creating the Council of Ministers for the Defense of the Reich to act in Hitler's stead, and setting out its membership and procedures.

The idea for the Council appears to have originated with Göring, with Hitler agreeing to it in order to get legislation needed for the war effort quickly put into action. Hitler retained the right to overrule the council. In effect, his power had been delegated to the council, which did not replace him.

== Members ==
All Council members were also members of the larger Reich Cabinet proper, which had met for the last time on 5 February 1938. The members of the council were:

Portrait	Name (Lifespan)	Term of office			Notes
Portrait	Name (Lifespan)	Took office	Left office	Duration	Notes
	Hermann Göring (1893–1946)	30 August 1939	23 April 1945	5 years, 236 days	Hitler's designated heir and head of the Four Year Plan – which controlled the war economy – who served as the Council's chairman.
	Rudolf Hess (1894–1987)	30 August 1939	10 May 1941	1 year, 253 days	The Deputy Führer, as the representative of the Nazi Party.
	Martin Bormann (1900–1945)	29 May 1941	2 May 1945	3 years, 338 days	After Hess's flight to Scotland, he was replaced on the Council by Bormann, his former Chief of Staff and Personal Secretary. After 1 September 1939, however, Bormann was in personal attendance on Hitler in his role as Secretary to the Führer, and therefore could not represent the office of the Deputy to the Führer on the Council when Hitler was away from Berlin.
	Wilhelm Frick (1877–1946)	30 August 1939	8 May 1945	5 years, 251 days	The Interior Minister, as the General Plenipotentiary (Generalbevollmächtigter) for the Reich Administration until 1943. Continued to be member of the Council.
	Heinrich Himmler (1900–1945)	24 August 1943	29 April 1945	1 year, 248 days	After Frick's dismissal as the Interior Minister and the General Plenipotentiary of the Reich Administration, he was replaced on the Council by Himmler, his successor in these posts.
	Walther Funk (1890–1960)	30 August 1939	8 May 1945	5 years, 251 days	The Economics Minister, as the General Plenipotentiary for the Economy.
	Wilhelm Keitel (1882–1946)	30 August 1939	8 May 1945	5 years, 251 days	The Chief of the Armed Forces High Command (Oberkommando der Wehrmacht), as the representative of the military.
	Hans Lammers (1879–1962)	30 August 1939	8 May 1945	5 years, 251 days	The Chief of the Reich Chancellery, representing Hitler.

== Authority and actions ==
The council, per Hitler's decree, was given the right to issue decrees "with the force of law" for the whole period "of the current foreign policy tension". These decrees did not have to be signed by Hitler, and were instead signed by Göring, with countersignatures by Frick or Lammers. The decrees were prepared by departments of the Reich government. Hitler was only consulted in cases where the council was uncertain of what course of action to take.

Because Hitler has confined the council to issuing decrees which were only effective within "the territory of the German Reich" – which included the General Government (i.e. the rump of Poland – any measures which the Council wished to initiate for other territories under German control had to be discussed with the administrations of those areas. These included the Reich Minister for the occupied Eastern territories, the two Reich Commissioners for Norway and the Netherlands, and six additional territorial administrators, in addition to any affected military commanders, each of whom would then decide whether they would issue the suggested decree for their area.

Within the council was an even smaller "Board of Three" (Dreierkollegium) which consisted of Göring, Frick and Keitel – or Frick, Funk and Keitel – which could also issue decrees using Frick's authority as Plenipotentiary for Reich Administration or for economic matters Göring's authority as head of the war economy super-agency, the Four Year Plan.

According to Wilhelm Frick, in a lecture on "The Reich Administration during Wartime," delivered on 7 March 1940 at the University of Freiburg:

Within the organization of our state, the position of the Ministerial Council for the Defense of the Reich is characterized by the fact that for the duration of the war, it became the highest permanent organ of the Reich with comprehensive jurisdiction, responsible only to the Fuehrer. … In order to perform its duties, the Ministerial Council for the Defense of the Reich has the power to issue decree laws. This power is restricted only so far as the Fuehrer may order the passing of a law by the Reich Cabinet or the Reichstag. Otherwise the legislative power of the Ministerial Council for the Defense of the Reich is without restriction, it has the power to regulate everything by decree.

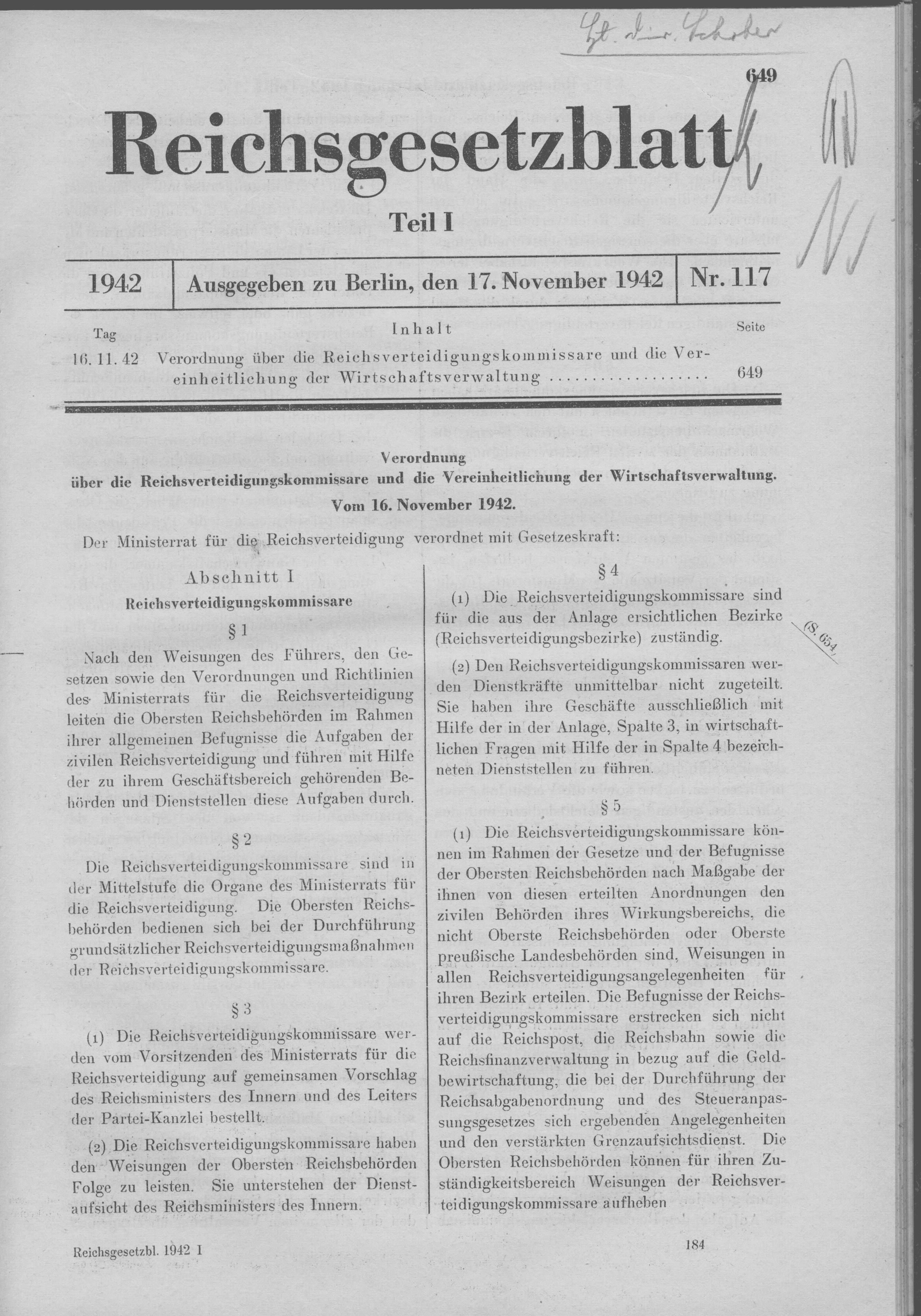
Decree of 16 November 1942 stating: "The Council of Ministers for the Defense of the Reich decrees by law:"

The council, upon coming into existence, immediately began issuing decrees touching on all aspects of Reich defense. Following the outbreak of the war on 1 September 1939, it appointed Nazi Party Gauleiters to the position of Reich Defense Commissioner (Reichsverteidigungskommissar) in each of the 15 Military Districts (Wehrkreis) to organize civil defense and mobilization. Later in the war (16 November 1942) the council would decree a change in jurisdiction from the Wehrkreis to the Gau level, and all 42 Gauleiters became Reich Defense Commissioners. (See image.) Another decree, issued on 5 September 1939, increased the penalties for certain criminal acts against persons or property during wartime. Another, issued on 7 September 1939, involved a ban on listening to foreign radio broadcasts.

Despite these decrees, the council had little real practical impact, aside from reducing even further the policy influence of the individual ministries, continuing the trend of turning each into a mere technical apparatus which implemented decisions from above. The Council met on only a small number of occasions, and not after mid-November 1939, Göring having essentially lost interest in it.

Historian Martin Broszat points out that:

In theory this new War Cabinet could have become a new collegiate organ of the Reich government with Göring at the head of the cabinet. in practice, however, Göring did not make use of such possibilities. Instead, like Hitler, he soon urged that any extensive legislative schemes should be shelved during the war. On 5 June 1940, a Führer decree was also issued that ordered 'that all laws and regulations which are not directly relevant to the defense of the Reich must be postponed indefinitely'.

Although Broszat refers to the council as a "war cabinet", Hitler biographer, historian Ian Kershaw, points out that a true war cabinet would have included Joseph Goebbels, the Minister of Propaganda, and the Foreign Minister, Joachim von Ribbentrop. In Kershaw's assessment:

...Hitler's own sharp antennae towards any restriction on his power, any limitation to the principles of his untrammeled personalized rule, vitiated from the outset the possibility of a true delegation of the head of government's role to Göring and the erection of a genuine 'war cabinet'. Such was Hitler's sensitivity to anything which might impose limits on his own freedom of action, or constitute a possible internal threat to his position, that he would block Lammer's feeble attempts to reinstate cabinet meetings in 1942, and even refuse permission for ministers to gather occasionally for an evening around a beer table.

== Postwar indictment ==
The Council ceased to exist with the fall of the Nazi regime on 8 May 1945. As part of the Reichsregierung (Reich Government) the council, along with the broader Reich Cabinet, was indicted as a criminal organization by the International Military Tribunal (IMT). Although it was ultimately adjudged at the conclusion of the Nuremberg trials to not be a criminal organization, all surviving members of the council were individually indicted by the IMT.

== Fate of Council members ==
Bormann died by committing suicide during the Battle of Berlin on 2 May 1945. Himmler committed suicide on 23 May 1945 while in British custody. Göring, Frick, and Keitel were condemned to death at the Nuremberg trials in October 1946. Göring committed suicide the night before his scheduled execution, but the other two were hanged on 16 October. Hess and Funk received sentences of life imprisonment. Funk was released in 1957 due to ill health and died in 1960; Hess committed suicide in 1987 while still incarcerated at Spandau Prison. Lammers received a sentence of 20 years in the Ministries Trial in 1949, with the term later commuted to 10 years. He was released from prison in 1951 and died in 1962.
