= Anna Strasser =

Austrian WWII resistance activist

- Born: 15 April 1921; St. Valentin, Lower Austria, First Austrian Republic
- Died: 17 May 2010 (aged 89)

Anna Strasser (15 April 1921 – 17 May 2010) was an Austrian resistance activist during World War II who helped forced-labour and concentration-camp victims until her arrest in 1944.

She was interned and interrogated in a concentration camp and prisons, followed by time in a labour camp.

== Early life ==
=== Early years ===
Anna Strasser was born in St. Valentin, a small country town near Linz, Austria. She was the twelfth of her parents' children and had two half-siblings from her father's first marriage.

Her father, Johann Strasser, worked for an insurance company and died in 1938. After his death, her mother took on her husband's job at the insurance agency while her eldest stepdaughter took charge of the family shop. At 17, Strasser started an apprenticeship in Linz in the support office of a medical doctor.

On her 18th birthday in 1939, Strasser began working in the bookkeeping department at the warehouse depot of an agricultural co-operative in Mauthausen.

== World War II ==
=== Resistance work ===
The agricultural co-operative Strasser worked at was required to provide produce to the Mauthausen-Gusen concentration camp. Some SS officers reportedly boasted to Strasser about their killings of inmates.

One very young SS member came into pay the bills who seemed to have been profoundly traumatised by what he had seen. Strasser told the man that he should place himself "on the side of the good ones", and use his position to the benefit of inmates. The two shook hands and the man left; Strasser never saw him again, but often prayed for him.

==== Food supplies ====
The depot was close to the camp and Strasser started taking a walk past the camp during her lunch break. She began carrying basic supplies with her, such as bread, sugar, biscuits, sewing needles, twine and buttons. Sometimes she dropped them where inmates might find them, and inmates learned to watch for her lunch break walks. On one occasion she received a letter of gratitude that the inmates had managed to send using the postal service.

The store manager, Franz Winklehner, began purchasing maize, turnips, cabbage and potatoes from farmers making deliveries to the depot, exchanging them for fertilizers and settling the balance. He sometimes threw bread and cigarettes to newly arrived detainees being transported past his office, to the camp. Winklehner's home was in the same building as the co-operative offices. One evening towards the end of 1940 the Winklehners received a visit at home from two Gestapo men and he was taken to Linz for questioning and then taken to the Dachau concentration camp. On 26 February 1941 his wife received a letter in which he wrote that he would probably be released in a couple of months in an amnesty to be announced in celebration of Hitler's birthday. However, this did not come to be, as news later came that he had died, allegedly of "circulatory disorders". Strasser accompanied his widow to see his body.

In 1942 Strasser was recruited to work in the vast new Nibelungenwerk (a tank factory) at nearby Herzograd (administratively part of St. Valentin), where Tiger tanks were being produced by a workforce that would eventually reach approximately 15,000. Strasser worked at the plant until her arrest in September 1944. She was assigned to the accounts department where she would look out of the windows, and see prisoners from Mauthausen (who had been conscripted as forced labourers to work at the plant) being beaten to death. One day she collapsed and wept uncontrollably for a sustained period which led to her being placed on sick leave. After being seen by a specialist doctor she was assigned to work mornings only.

==== Medical supplies ====
At this time, large numbers of Jewish families arrived at the nearby Windberg camp from Hungary. Each day they were driven past the Strasser family's shop to the sports fields behind the house, where they were tasked with building bunkers. They were mostly former office workers who needed help with the physical work. One of the detainees was a doctor who repeatedly visited the shop and took the opportunity to push notes to Anna’s sister Maria begging for certain specified drugs and medications. Strasser began visiting Dr. Kleinsasser, the local railway doctor, who although a party member, was sympathetic to her cause. Strasser persuaded the doctor wrote out the necessary prescriptions, identifying her as the patient and she took the prescriptions to various pharmacies across six local towns, in order to avoid triggering suspicion. After dark she took the medications to the sports fields and left them in pre-agreed locations. Sometimes she set off the barking of dogs, but she was never caught.

=== Arrest ===
During 1943 and most of 1944 Strasser continued to seek out opportunities to help victims of government persecution. In summer 1944, the Strasser sisters received a visit from two men, allegedly from a Vienna-based resistance group, who asked about the progress of their various projects. During the conversation, Strasser realised that they had been sent by the Gestapo.

On 11 September 1944 she arrived home to find the local policeman waiting for her in an agitated state. He told her that a Gestapo man was waiting for her in the house. When she went inside, a man explained politely that he had to arrest her for anti-state activities. (Note: "Ich muss sie wegen staatsfeindlicher Umtriebe verhaften.") She was taken to the police station and was able to make one or two short telephone calls to friends and relatives. She was then escorted onto a bus that was normally used to take people to work at the Nibelungenwerk (tank factory). She sat beside a Polish doctor whom she knew because they both worked at the factory. She gave him the last of the biscuits she had with her along with some cigarettes, earning herself a shouted reprimand from a Gestapo man accompanying them: "We are not in a coffee house, what are you thinking of!" (Note: "Wir sind doch in keinem Kaffeehaus, was bilden Sie sich ein!")

When the bus reached St. Pölten, the Gestapo office was full and they were taken to the district courthouse, where they were handed over to the policeman in charge. Later that day she was taken to a larger cell with six women who had all been arrested for relatively trivial offences, but nevertheless each had received an eighteen-month sentence.

=== Gestapo treatment ===
==== Interrogation ====
Some days later she was taken for interrogation, where she asserted that she had done nothing contrary to the interests of the state. (Note: "Ich kann Ihnen keine Antwort geben, weil die Fragen auf mich nicht zutreffen. Meines Erachtens habe ich dem Staat nach bestem Gewissen gedient. Ich habe solange gearbeitet, bis ich buchstäblich zusammengebrochen bin. Der Facharzt ließ mich dann nur mehr halbtätig ins Büro gehen und den anderen halben Tag arbeite ich zum Ausgleich im Geschäft meiner Schwester.") The interrogations were aggressive and attacked her religious beliefs. On 21 September 1944 she was taken from her cell to the police prison, which had by now become a Gestapo centre. She was chained to the wall and was not given food for four days, when a policeman sneaked in some bread. During this time, she reflected and prayed.

On the third day three Gestapo men came to her cell and threatened her, saying they would cut off her hair and confiscated her hairpins, shoelaces, suspenders and bra. (Note: "Sollte ich je hier herauskommen, werde ich weiterhin bedürftige Menschen unterstützen, denn es ist für mich selbstverständlich, wenn ein Mensch in Not ist, dass ich ihm helfe. Nun habe ich nichts mehr zu sagen.") After a week, she was brought to an office, where she was told that the authorities were not really interested in the little people such as herself, but in the "big fish" of the resistance movement. She was to be returned to society if she collaborated with her interrogators; otherwise, they told her she should not expect to come out alive. She was thrown down a set of stairs and returned to her cell and given poor-quality food.

The next day during her interrogation session Strasser dictated her life story, which was converted into a detailed 13-page document that included her recollection of her treatment by the Gestapo and concluded with an assurance that if she ever got out she would resume her support for needy people. (Note: "Sollte ich je hier herauskommen, werde ich weiterhin bedürftige Menschen unterstützen, denn es ist für mich selbstverständlich, wenn ein Mensch in Not ist, dass ich ihm helfe. Nun habe ich nichts mehr zu sagen.") The contents were largely or wholly already known to her interrogator and she was able to dictate without interruption.

==== Prison ====
On 30 September 1944 she was returned to the St. Pölten district courthouse, where she rejoined her co-workers, mending laundry in the "sewing room" cell. She was welcomed back to the courthouse cell block with enthusiasm. Her hitherto atheist comrade Sophie Krakovski admitted to having prayed for her safe return every day and claimed to have been converted to belief by Strasser's return.

Strasser was assigned to a range of jobs, including working in the gardens, where she was able to eat carrots. She was granted a wider range of freedoms including some attendance at Mass. She was permitted to receive a visit from her pregnant sister Helli and, under the supervision of a Gestapo man, permitted to eat some of the apples Helli had brought. During that visit there was an air-raid warning, whereupon her sister and the Gestapo man ran off to the air-raid shelter, where he tried to find out more about her "activities" from her sister. Her sister could honestly assert that she knew nothing about any of her sister’s activities.

Throughout late 1944, Strasser continued to sometimes be asked by the Gestapo to identify suspected anti-government activists. Sometimes they were people she recognised, but as far as the Gestapo were concerned she never succeeded in recognising any. She never found out whether the Gestapo believed her.

=== Post-war ===
Strasser was released from prison at the end of the war.

At that time, Lower Austria was under Soviet occupation. Dr. Kleinsasser was denounced to the Soviet authorities as a Nazi and taken away. Strasser accompanied the doctor's son to visit the Soviet military commander and told the man about the many prescriptions Dr. Kleinsasser had written out, despite knowing that they were for Jewish prisoners. The Soviet commander allowed Kleinsasser to return home, and he lived on in St. Valentin for several more years.

== Post-war life ==
After the war, Strasser worked as a sales representative promoting Persil washing powder.

For several decades following the war, she did not speak about the Nazi era. During the 1980s, she began to tell her story of that period.

In 1999, the municipal authorities at St. Valentin made her an honorary citizen in recognition of her work.
