= Paul Körner =

German Nazi official (1893–1957)

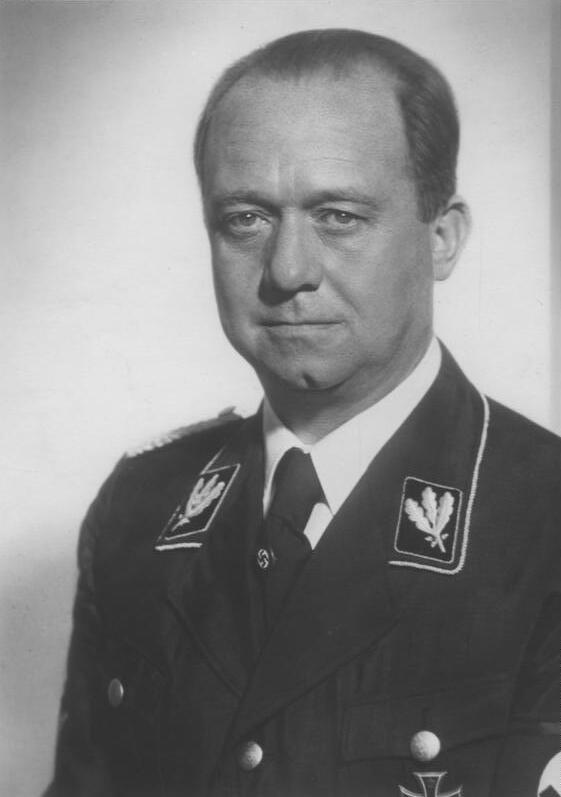

State Secretary Prussian State Ministry
- In office 11 April 1933 – 8 May 1945
- Prime Minister: Hermann Göring
- Preceded by: Position created
- Succeeded by: Position abolished

State Secretary Four Year Plan
- In office 22 October 1936 – 8 May 1945
- Preceded by: Position created
- Succeeded by: Position abolished

Personal details
- Born: 2 October 1893 Pirna, Kingdom of Saxony, German Empire
- Died: 29 November 1957 (aged 64) Tegernsee, Bavaria, West Germany
- Party: National Socialist German Workers' Party (NSDAP)
- Occupation: Businessman

Military service
- Allegiance: German Empire
- Branch/service: Imperial German Army
- Years of service: 1914–1918
- Rank: Major
- Unit: 28th (2nd Royal Saxon) Field Artillery Regiment
- Battles/wars: World War I: Western Front
- Awards: Iron Cross, First class

Paul Körner (2 October 1893 – 29 November 1957) was a German Nazi functionary who served as State Secretary of both the Prussian State Ministry and the Four Year Plan. A close associate of Hermann Göring, he was also an SS-Obergruppenführer and was convicted as a war criminal by the Nuremberg Military Tribunal.

== Early life ==
Körner was the son of a physician. He attended elementary school and the gymnasium in Zittau, graduating in 1912. He studied law at the University of Berlin until volunteering for the First World War in 1914, in which he initially fought on the Western Front with the 28th (2nd Royal Saxon) Field Artillery Regiment. Commissioned as a Leutnant, he rose to the rank of Hauptmann and was posted as an adjutant to Erich Ludendorff, the Deputy Chief of the German General Staff in December 1917. He was awarded the Iron Cross 1st Class and was discharged as a Major in the reserves.

After his discharge from the army, Körner served as a member of the Lützow Freikorps for the early part of 1919. He then worked in a managerial position in business. In 1926 he met Hermann Göring and became his Sturmabteilung (SA) adjutant. In February 1931, he joined the Nazi Party (membership number 714,328). In December 1931 he also became a member of the Schutzstaffel (SS membership number 23,076).

== Nazi-Party career ==
After the Nazi seizure of power on 30 January 1933, Körner was appointed as a personal advisor to Göring, who was the interior minister of Prussia. On 11 April 1933, when Göring became Minister President of Prussia, he appointed Körner as State Secretary to the Prussian State Ministry. Körner assumed the routine management of ministerial affairs for Göring. As State Secretary, Körner also represented Prussia in the Reichsrat until its abolition on 14 February 1934. On 11 July 1933, he was made a member of the Prussian State Council. At the March 1933 parliamentary election, Körner was elected as a deputy of the Reichstag from electoral constituency 28, Dresden–Bautzen and served until November. He returned to the Reichstag at the March 1936 election from constituency 2 (Berlin West) and retained that seat until the fall of the Nazi regime in May 1945.

In October 1936, when Göring was named Representative (Beauftragter) of the newly established Four Year Plan with plenipotentiary power, Körner was brought along as the State Secretary. In this role Körner played a key role in rearming the military and preparing the German economy for war. His role was further enhanced in December 1939 when Körner was named Göring’s Deputy on the General Council of the Four Year Plan, which oversaw the workings of the many departments, and where he generally presided over the Council meetings in Göring’s place.

After the launching of the war against the Soviet Union in Operation Barbarossa, Körner was named Göring’s Deputy on the newly former “Economic Executive Staff East” within the Four Year Plan in July 1941. This organization directed the exploitation and looting of the occupied eastern territories with regard to agricultural products and raw materials such as oil and minerals.

In April 1942, the recently appointed Reich Minister of Armaments and Munitions, Albert Speer, proposed that Göring establish a Central Planning Board within the Four Year Plan. Göring approved it with the condition that Körner become a member. The new Board was charged with making more efficient use of raw materials and manpower in directing the German war economy. The Board requisitioned labor with the full knowledge that their demands would be supplied by foreign forced labor, including prisoners of war. Körner served on the Board from 1942 to the end of the Nazi regime in 1945.

In addition, Körner was also chairman of the supervisory board of the ore mining and ironworks conglomerate Reichswerke Hermann Göring from July 1937 to 1942. This organization employed forced foreign labor and prisoners of war. He was also chairman of the board of directors of Mining and Smelting Works East ( Berg- und Hüttenwerksgesellschaft Ost) from 20 August 1941 to 31 March 1943. This Reich-owned monopoly "was the principal spoliation agency of the Reich with respect to industrial plants in occupied Russia" through which Körner "actively participated in … the plundering and spoliation of industrial properties".

Apart from his governmental positions, Körner had a long career with the SS. He was promoted to SS-Gruppenführer in March 1934, and served in the SS Senior District East (Oberabschnitt Ost) headquartered in Berlin from 1 October 1934 through 1 April 1936 when he was transferred to the staff of the Reichsführer-SS. His final promotion to SS-Obergruppenführer came on 30 January 1942. He also held a commission in the military, as Göring made him a Major in the Luftwaffe reserves in 1936 and promoted him to Oberstleutnant in February 1942.

== Post-war life ==
At the end the war, Körner was arrested by the Allies. On 12 March 1946, Körner testified in Göring’s defense as a witness before the International Military Tribunal in Nuremberg. Later put on trial himself, on 11 April 1949 he was convicted of war crimes at the Ministries Trial and sentenced to fifteen years in prison. Körner was found guilty of crimes against peace, war crimes, crimes against humanity and membership in a criminal organization. Körner's sentence was reduced to ten years on 31 January 1951. He was released from Landsberg Prison on 16 December 1951 as a result of an amnesty. He died on 29 November 1957.

== Sources ==
- Speer, Albert (1970). Inside the Third Reich. New York: Avon Books. ISBN 978-0380000715.
- Williams, Max (2017). SS Elite: The Senior Leaders of Hitler's Praetorian Guard. Vol. 2. Fonthill Media LLC. ISBN 978-1-78155-434-0.
- Zentner, Christian; Bedürftig, Friedemann, eds. (1997) [1991]. The Encyclopedia of the Third Reich. New York: Da Capo Press. ISBN 978-0-306-80793-0.

== External websites ==
- Newspaper clippings about Paul Körner in the 20th Century Press Archives of the ZBW
- Information about Paul Körner in the Reichstag database
