= Central Planning Board =

Nazi German governmental production planning agency

Central Planning Board (Zentrale Planung)
Agency overview
- Formed: 22 April 1942
- Dissolved: 8 May 1945
- Jurisdiction: Entire German war economy
- Agency executives: Albert Speer; Erhard Milch; Paul Körner; Walther Funk
- Parent agency: Four Year Plan

The Central Planning Board (German: Zentrale Planung) was a high level governmental production planning agency set up in Nazi Germany, which was active between 1942 and 1945. Its main aim was to make more efficient use of raw materials and manpower in directing the German war economy.

== Establishment ==
The Board was formally established on 22 April 1942 by a decree of Reichsmarschall Hermann Göring in his capacity as Representative (Beauftragter) of the Four Year Plan. The Board initially was composed of: (1) Albert Speer, the Reich Minister of Armaments and Munitions, as well as the General Plenipotentiary for Armament Tasks in the Four Year Plan, (2) Generalfeldmarschall Erhard Milch, the State Secretary in the Reich Ministry of Aviation, and (3) Paul Körner, the State Secretary for the Four Year Plan and a close associate of Göring. In September 1943, (4) Walther Funk, the Reich Minister of Economics, as well as the General Plenipotentiary for the Economy, was added as a fourth member.

According to Speer, he and Milch jointly brought the idea for a central planning agency within the Four Year Plan to Göring on 2 April 1942 and Goring approved it, with the caveat that his close associate Körner be included. About its creation, Speer stated:

This “Central Planning” soon became the most important institution in our war economy. Actually, it was incomprehensible that a top board of this sort to direct the various programs and priorities had not been established long ago.

== Functions and results ==
The Board had supreme authority over procurement and allocation of raw materials and scheduling of production for the German war economy, and sought to achieve consolidation of all controls over German war production in a single agency. It determined the labor requirements of industry, agriculture and all other components of the German war economy, and made requisitions for and allocations of that labor. In this, it made use of conscripted foreign forced laborers and prisoners of war by requisitioning labor from Fritz Sauckel, the General Plenipotentiary for the Allocation of Labor. The Board determined the total number of laborers needed for German industry and required Sauckel to produce them, usually by deportation from occupied territories. The Board requisitioned labor with the full knowledge that their demands would be supplied by foreign forced labor. It has been estimated that over 12 million such laborers eventually were brought forcibly to Germany to work, often by brutal coercion.

The Board held its first meeting on 27 April 1942. War crimes proceedings after the war documented some 58 meetings of the Central Planning Board between its establishment in April 1942 and May 1944, the period of its peak activity.

The Board's efforts had a dramatic effect on German industrial output. From 1942 to 1943, ammunition production more than doubled, aircraft production increased from about 14,000 to over 25,000 and production of tanks rose from 5,500 to 12,000. Production continued to rise the following year, reaching a peak in the second half of 1944.

== Fate of Board members ==
At the conclusion of the war, all four members of the Central Planning Board were indicted as war criminals, at least in part due to their involvement with the Board and its use of forced labor. Speer and Funk were indicted by the International Military Tribunal in the trial of the major Nazi war criminals and, on 1 October 1946, they were found guilty. Funk was sentenced to life imprisonment but released in 1957 and died in 1960. Speer was sentenced to 20 years imprisonment, released in 1966 and died in 1981. Milch was tried separately by the Nuremberg Military Tribunal, convicted on 17 April 1947, sentenced to life imprisonment (commuted to 15 years in 1951) but released in 1954 and died in 1972. Körner was tried in the Ministries Trial, convicted on 11 April 1949 and sentenced to 15 years imprisonment (reduced to 10 years in 1951). Released the same year, he died in 1957.

== External website ==
- Decree of 22 April 1942 Creating the Central Planning Board (Pages 973-974: Document NOKW-244)
