= Nibelungenwerk =

Largest and most modern tank factory in Nazi Germany

Coordinates: 48°09′24″N 14°30′08″E

The Nibelungenwerk (also known as the Nibelungenwerke or Ni-Werk) was the largest and most modern tank assembly factory in Nazi Germany, located near the Austrian town of St. Valentin. As the only German tank production facility which had a well-structured production line, the Nibelungenwerk produced more than half of all of Nazi Germany's Panzer IV tanks.

== History ==
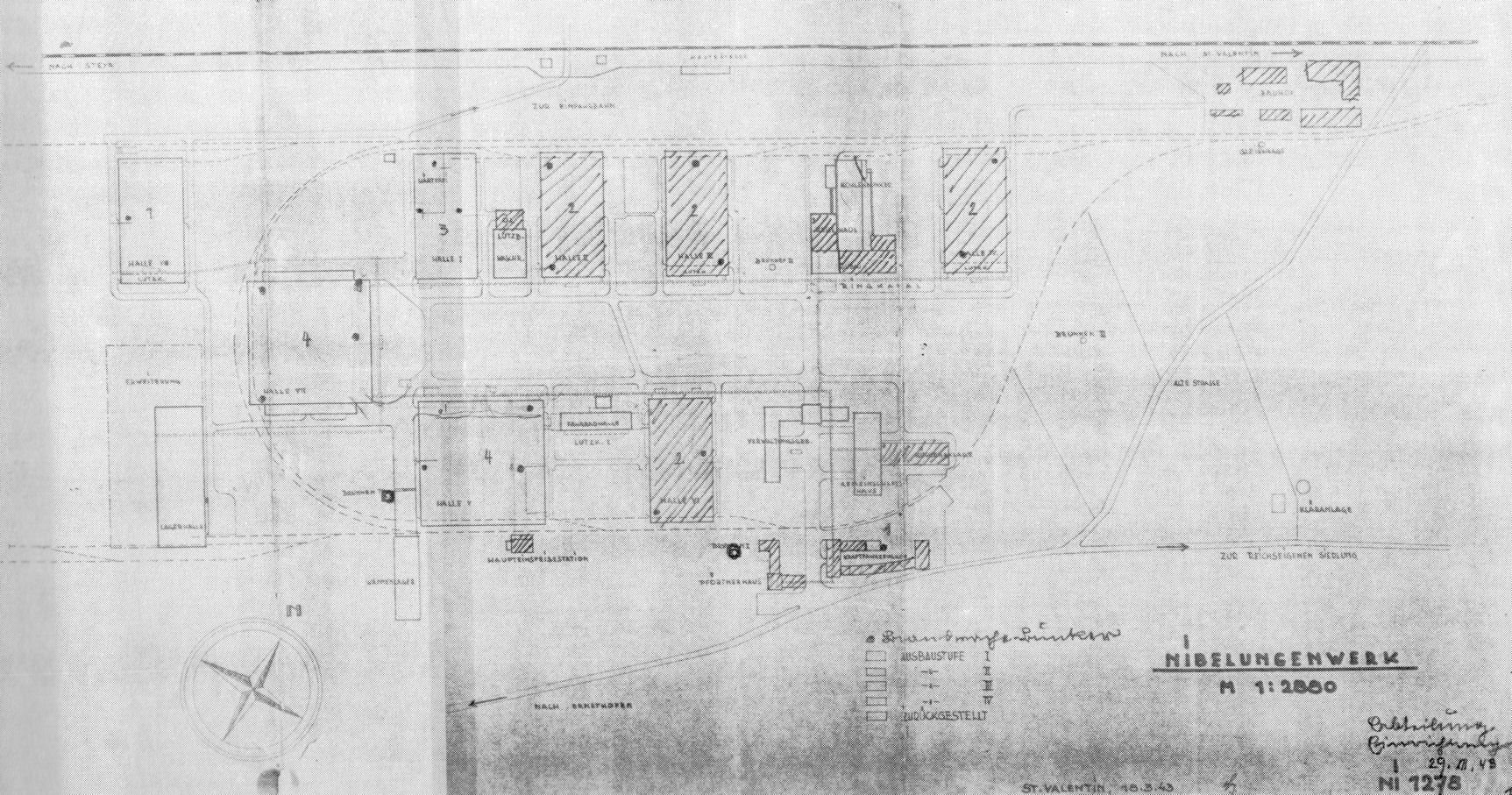
Plan from 1943 of the expanded plant (shaded: existing buildings)

The Nibelungenwerk was built as part of the Four Year Plan after the Anschluss as part of an armaments centre, along with the Eisenwerke Oberdonau. There had been plans dating back to 1939 to build an armaments plant in the Herzograd Forest near the Lower Austrian community of Sankt Valentin, which was conveniently located at a railway junction. The construction cost of 65 million Reichsmarks was paid by the Reichswerke Hermann Göring and the factory was from the outset very generously specified. Although the bulk of new construction projects for the armaments industry were frozen at the time, that did not affect the Nibelungenwerk as Hermann Göring, a representative for the four-year plan, favoured the project.

The official opening took place in 1942, and eventual monthly production capacity was planned to be 320 tanks, although this was never achieved.

=== Expansion stages ===
The Nibelungenwerk was built in four stages:

- The first stage was mostly focused on construction with a start-up workshop set up at Steyr-Daimler-Puch's main factory in Steyr for tank spare parts in mid-1940.
- The second stage included supply contracts for parts production were awarded beginning on 23 December 1940, including the production of 5,400 wheels for the Krupp-Gruson-Werke in Magdeburg-Buckau.
- In 1942, with the completion of the third stage of expansion, series production of the Panzer IV began, along with assembly of the Tiger I.
- With the last expansion stage in 1943, production capacity was increased.

Eventually, the factory consisted of a total of nine halls. Seven halls were 120 meters long and 60 meters wide and made of reinforced concrete. The other two halls were of steel construction and were 120 meters long and 120 meters wide. In order to maintain production even after bombing raids, the factory was supplied with electricity, compressed air, heat and water through an underground system. The factory was also connected to two railway lines, with each hall having its own siding.

=== Workforce ===
In the late autumn of 1941, the workforce stood at 4,800 people, mainly from Austria and Germany. During the course of the war, many Austrian and German workers were conscripted and replaced by foreign prisoners of war. In numerical order these were French, Italians, Greeks, Yugoslavs, Russians and, finally, 600 concentration camp inmates. The number of workers at the end of 1944 amounted to about 8,500 people. Due to the growing shortage of skilled workers and the time-consuming training and instruction of foreign workers, relatively large-scale concessions were made to the increasingly important foreign workers. Thus, in addition to the toleration of a brothel in the camp settlement, the skilled workers were allowed holidays, which after the successful Allied invasion of Normandy had the consequence that many Frenchmen did not return. In August 1944, an external camp of the Mauthausen-Gusen concentration camp complex was built on the site, in which 1,500 prisoners were accommodated and used for forced labour.

=== Production ===
Of the total of 8,500 Panzer IVs produced, nearly 4,800 were produced in the Nibelungenwerk.

After completion of the four expansion stages, the plant was the largest tank factory under Axis control. In addition to the Panzer IV, 576 self-propelled guns (Sturmgeschütz IV and Jagdpanzer IV) were produced and the factory also converted the Porsche version of the Tiger I to the Elefant.

The Nibelungenwerk was the only German tank factory which had a well-structured assembly line, with main and secondary lines. The production lines consisted of simple load-carriers, which were coupled with rods and moved forward with a cable. The production station times varied between four minutes, for the wheel suspension, to several hours, for the final assembly. As only a third of the required individual parts were manufactured in-house, the production line was dependent on undisturbed supply logistics.

On October 17, 1944, the plant was badly damaged in an air raid. As a result, almost all the production had to be outsourced. Nevertheless, of 3,125 Panzer IVs produced in 1944, 2,845 were produced in the Nibelungenwerk. At the end of 1944 production of the Jagdtiger began. The conversion of the production took place without any problems, since the cranes and other technical equipment were over-specified. In the last days of the war, 65 Panther tanks and Tigers were repaired.

Including the October 1944 bombing raid, the plant was bombed at least 8 times by the Allied air forces during WWII. In 2021, an unexploded 1,100 lb bomb was discovered at a construction site near the old factory and was safely removed.

On May 8, 1945, American troops of the 259th Infantry Regiment of Major General Stanley Eric Reinhart's 65th Infantry Division occupied the city liberating the Nibelungenwerk's French and Soviet prisoners of war and Czech forced labourers.

After the Red Army occupied the factory on May 9, 1945, production continued on a small scale, so that some Panzer IVs could be made available for the victory parade in Moscow.

== The Nibelungenwerk after the war ==
The former supplier company Eisenwerke Oberdonau is today the most important steel factory in Austria and belongs to Voestalpine.

After the State Treaty in 1955, the Republic of Austria took over the Nibelungenwerk. In 1957, the plant was incorporated into Steyr-Daimler-Puch and in 1974 the entire tractor assembly of the Steyr group was transferred to the site.

Today, the former Nibelungenwerk and the associated grounds belong to the Canadian automotive supplier Magna International. The agricultural machinery manufacturer CNH Global has its European headquarters in St. Valentin and uses three former Nibelungenwerk halls for the production of tractor cabins. The former Nibelungenwerk's entrance building and canteen are still in use, and the hall located to the east is used by Magna International for the production of vehicle components. The former tank testing site is also owned by Magna International.
