= Walther Funk =

German economist and politician (1890–1960)

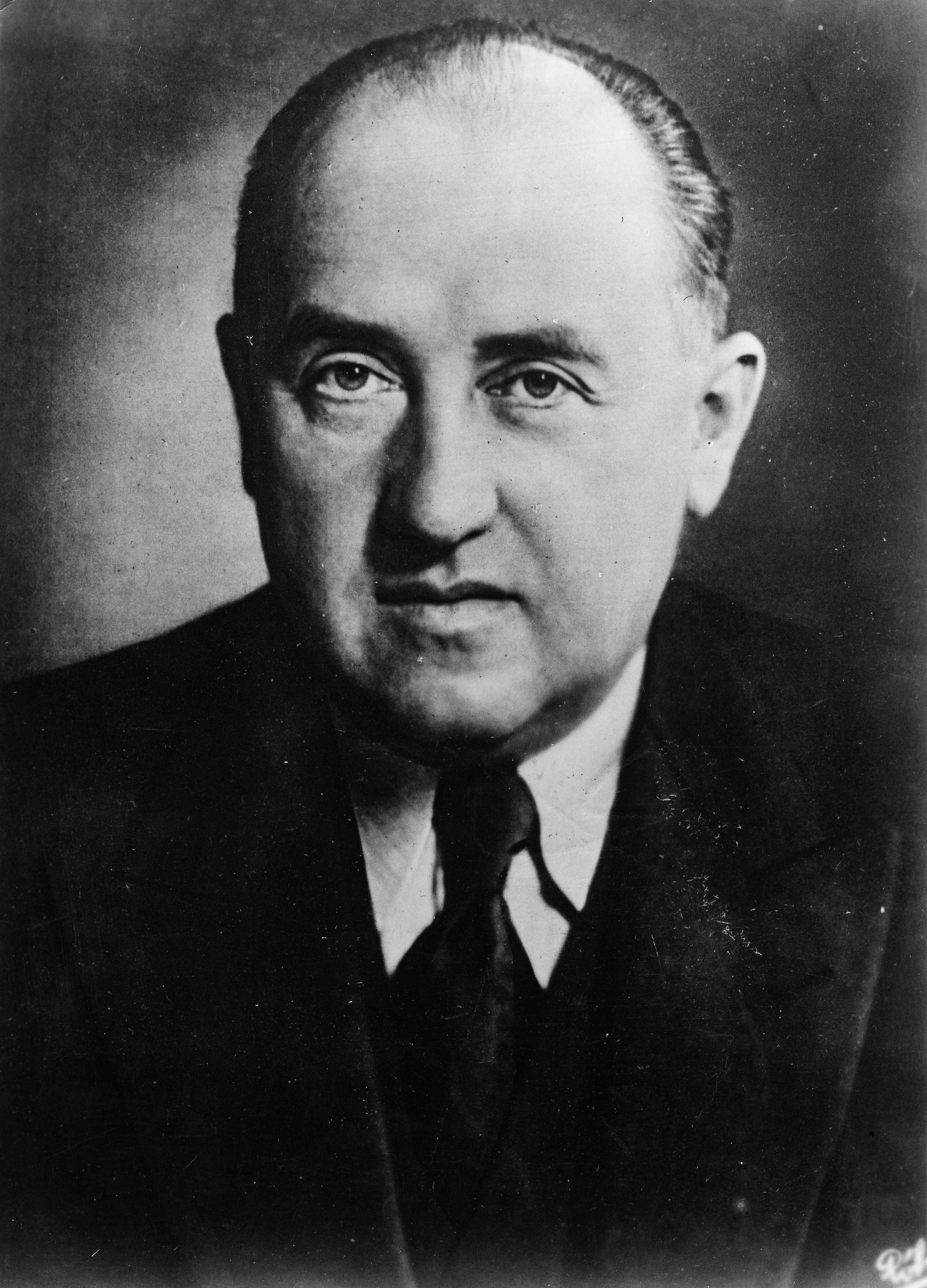
- Funk in 1943

Reichsminister of Economics
- In office 5 February 1938 – 5 May 1945
- President: Adolf Hitler (Führer); Karl Dönitz
- Chancellor: Adolf Hitler; Joseph Goebbels
- Preceded by: Hermann Göring
- Succeeded by: Albert Speer (as Minister of Industry and Production)

President of the Reichsbank
- In office 19 January 1939 – 8 May 1945
- Preceded by: Hjalmar Schacht
- Succeeded by: Office abolished

Reich Press Chief and State Secretary in the Ministry of Public Enlightenment and Propaganda
- In office 13 March 1933 – 26 November 1937
- Appointed by: Adolf Hitler
- Preceded by: Office established
- Succeeded by: Otto Dietrich (as Reich Press Chief); Karl Hanke (for all other remaining divisions)

Personal details
- Born: 18 August 1890 Danzkehmen, Prussia
- Died: 31 May 1960 (aged 69) Düsseldorf, West Germany
- Party: Nazi Party
- Spouse: Luise Schmidt-Sieben
- Education: University of Berlin; University of Leipzig (LLD)
- Profession: Economist
- Criminal information
- Status: Deceased
- Convictions: Crimes of aggression War crimes Crimes against humanity
- Trial: Nuremberg trials
- Penalty: Life imprisonment

Walther Immanuel Funk (18 August 1890 – 31 May 1960) was a German economist, Nazi official and convicted war criminal who served as Reichsminister for the Economy from 1938 to 1945 and president of the Reichsbank from 1939 to 1945. Funk oversaw the mobilization of the economy for Germany's rearmament and World War II, and the expropriation of assets of victims from Nazi concentration camps. He was convicted for crimes against humanity by the Nuremberg Tribunal.

Funk was a finance journalist before joining the Nazi Party in 1931 and being appointed to a senior post at the Ministry of Public Enlightenment and Propaganda. Funk was appointed as economics minister by Adolf Hitler to replace Hjalmar Schacht, as well as a member of the Council of Ministers for the Defense of the Reich and the Central Planning Board. Funk served as economics minister for nearly all of World War II until he was removed on 5 May 1945 after being left out of the Flensburg Government.

Funk was tried and convicted as a major war criminal by the International Military Tribunal at Nuremberg after the war and sentenced to life in prison. Funk was incarcerated in West Berlin until he was released on health grounds in 1957 and died three years later.

== Early life ==
Walther Immanuel Funk was born on 18 August 1890 in Danzkehmen (present-day Sosnovka in Kaliningrad Oblast, Russia) near Trakehnen, East Prussia, the son of merchant and entrepreneur Walther Funk and his wife Sophie (née Urbschat). He was the only one of the Nuremberg defendants who was born in the former eastern territories of Germany. Funk studied law, economics, and philosophy at the University of Berlin and the University of Leipzig, receiving his law doctorate in 1912. He subsequently trained as a journalist at newspapers National-Zeitung in Berlin and Leipziger Neueste Nachrichten in Leipzig.

Following the outbreak of World War I in 1914, Funk enlisted in the Imperial German Army and joined the infantry. He was wounded in action and subsequently discharged as medically unfit for service in 1916. Following the end of the war in 1918, he worked as a journalist, and in 1924 he became the editor of the centre-right financial newspaper the Berliner Börsenzeitung. In 1920, Funk married Luise Schmidt-Sieben.

== Political career ==
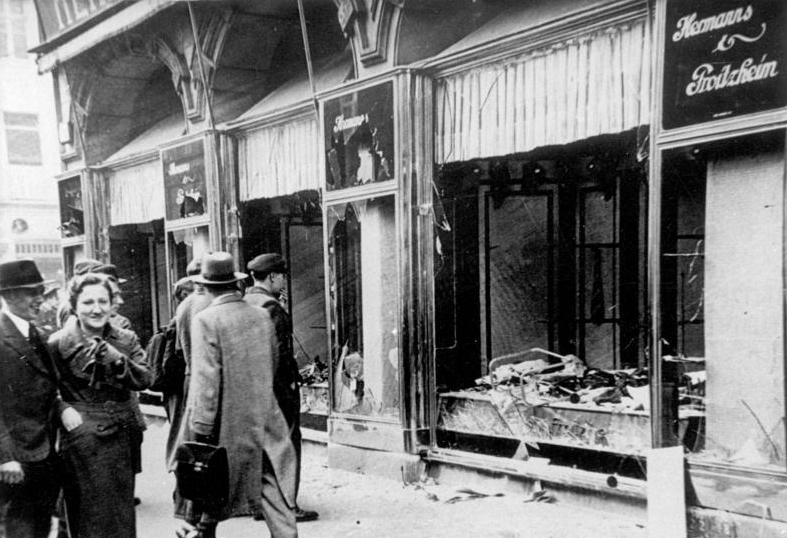
Smashed window of the front of a Jewish shop after Kristallnacht in November 1938

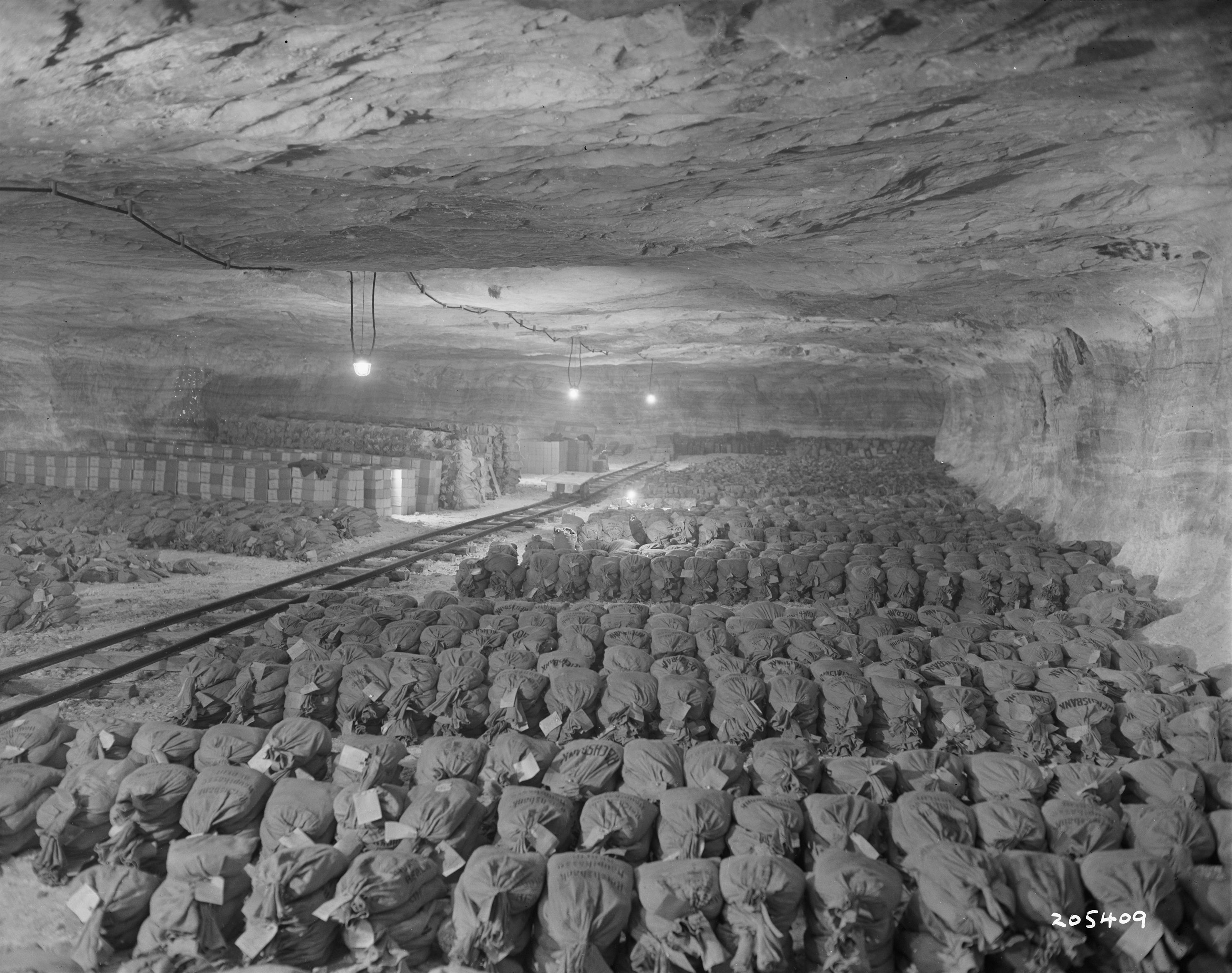
Nazi gold in Merkers Salt Mine

Funk, who was a nationalist and anti-Marxist, resigned from the Berliner Börsenzeitung in the summer of 1931 and joined the Nazi Party, becoming close to Gregor Strasser, who arranged his first meeting with Adolf Hitler. Partially because of his interest in economic policy, he was elected a Reichstag deputy in July 1932 and made chairman of the party's Committee on Economic Policy in December 1932, a post that he did not hold for long. After the Nazi Party came to power in 1933, he stepped down from his Reichstag position and was made Reich Chief Press Officer under Joseph Goebbels. The post involved censorship of anything deemed critical of Nazi policies.

In March 1933, Funk was appointed as a State Secretary (Staatssekretär) at the Reich Ministry of Public Enlightenment and Propaganda. In the summer of 1936, when Hitler commissioned Albert Speer for the rebuilding of central Berlin, it was Funk who proposed his new title of "Inspector-General of Buildings for the Renovation of the Reich Capital".

=== Economics minister ===
On 5 February 1938, Funk became General Plenipotentiary for Economics (Generalbevollmächtigter für die Wirtschaft), as well as Reichsminister for the Economy to permanently replace Hjalmar Schacht who had resigned on 26 November 1937. Funk also succeeded Schacht as Minister of Economics and Labor of Prussia (Preußischer Minister für Wirtschaft und Arbeit) and as an ex officio member of the Prussian State Council. He would hold all these posts until the fall of the Nazi regime. Schacht had been engaged in a power struggle with Reichsmarschall Hermann Göring, who wanted to tie the economics ministry more closely to his Four Year Plan Office. Göring briefly served as Schacht's immediate successor between November 1937 and January 1938 until Funk's appointment. Schacht, who knew Funk well, said he was "extraordinarily musical" being "a first-rate connoisseur of music whose personal preferences in life were decidedly for the artistic and literary." At a dinner when he sat next to Funk, the orchestra played a melody by Franz Lehár. Funk remarked "Ah! Lehár – the Fuhrer is particularly fond of his music." Schacht replied, jokingly, "It's a pity that Lehár is married to a Jewess", to which Funk immediately responded, "That's something the Fuhrer must not know on any account!" Speer relates how Hitler played for him a record of Franz Liszt's Les Préludes and said "This is going to be our victory fanfare for the Russian campaign. Funk chose it!"

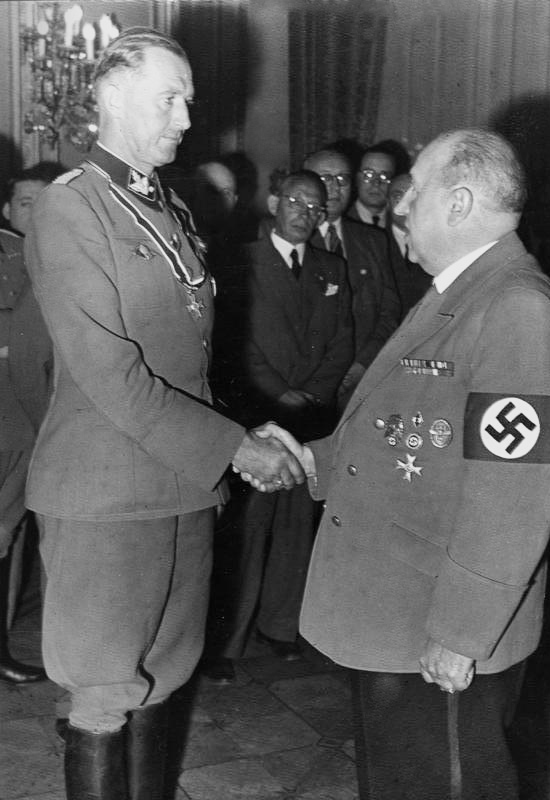
Funk (right) in August 1944 when his State Secretary, Franz Hayler, was awarded the Knight's Cross for the War Merit Cross.

Between April 1938 and March 1939, Funk was also a Director of the Switzerland-based multi-national Bank of International Settlements. In January 1939, Adolf Hitler appointed Funk as President of the Reichsbank. Funk recorded that by 1938 the German state had confiscated Jewish property worth two million Reichsmarks, using decrees from Hitler and other top Nazis to force German Jews to leave their property and assets to the state if they emigrated, such as the Reich Flight Tax.

On 30 August 1939, immediately prior to the outbreak of the Second World War, Funk was appointed by Hitler to the six-person Council of Ministers for Defense of the Reich which was set up to operate as a "war cabinet". Throughout the war years, Funk was present at a great many important meetings, including one about the Four Year Plan held in the Great Hall of the Air Ministry Building on 13 February 1942. The meeting included 30 crucial people in the Nazi government and was chaired by Field-Marshal Erhard Milch. Funk sat to the right of Milch, at his request. After much debate, Albert Vogler said "there must be one man able to make decisions. Industry did not care who it was." After further discussion, Funk stood up and nominated Milch as that man, though Speer whispered to Milch this was not a good idea. Milch declined the position, and five days later Hitler conferred the role on Speer. As he and Funk walked Hitler back to his apartment in the Chancery, Funk promised Speer that he would place everything at his disposal and do all in his power to help him. Speer relates that Funk "kept the promise, with minor exceptions." In September 1943, Funk was appointed as a fourth member of the Central Planning Board, which was charged with managing the raw materials and manpower for Germany's entire war economy. He subsequently joined Robert Ley, Speer and Goebbels in the struggle against the influence on Hitler by Martin Bormann. Funk and Milch were again together for Göring's birthday party on 12 January 1944 when Funk, as he did every year, delivered the birthday speech at the banquet.

Funk stayed in office until nearly the end of the Nazi regime, and was named by Hitler in his last will and testament to continue as Reichsminister for the Economy in the cabinet of Goebbels after his suicide on 30 April 1945. However, after Goebbels' own suicide the next day, Funk was not named to the Flensburg Government formed by Lutz Graf Schwerin von Krosigk, effectively ending his tenure as economics minister on 5 May. Schwerin von Krosigk, the Minister of Finance, did not include an economics minister in his new cabinet. On 11 May, Funk was arrested by Allied forces and sent to Camp Ashcan in Luxembourg to await trial.

== Nuremberg ==
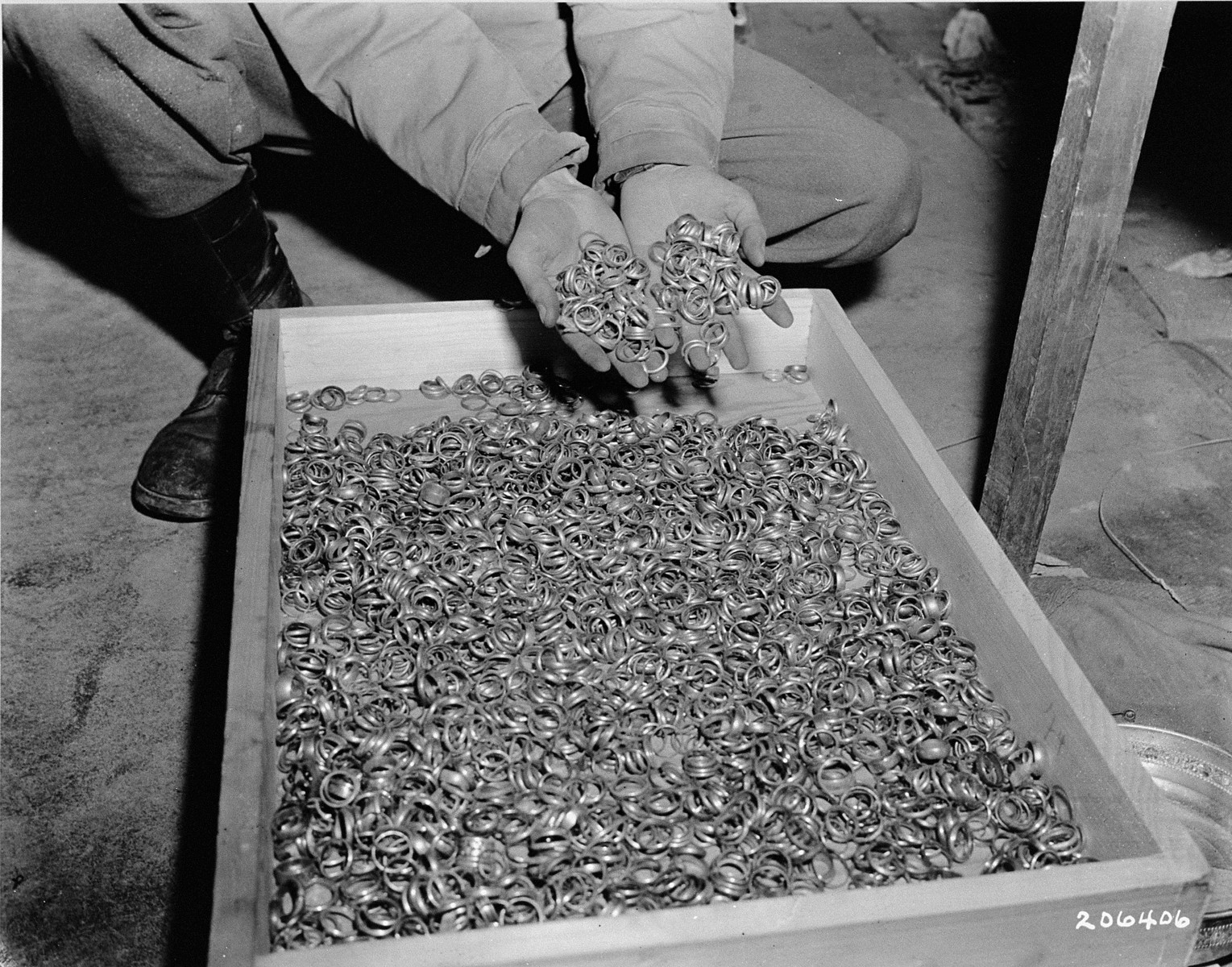
Gold rings of victims from Buchenwald concentration camp. Funk as Reichsminister for the Economy and President of the Reichsbank accepted the rings from the SS to be melted down.

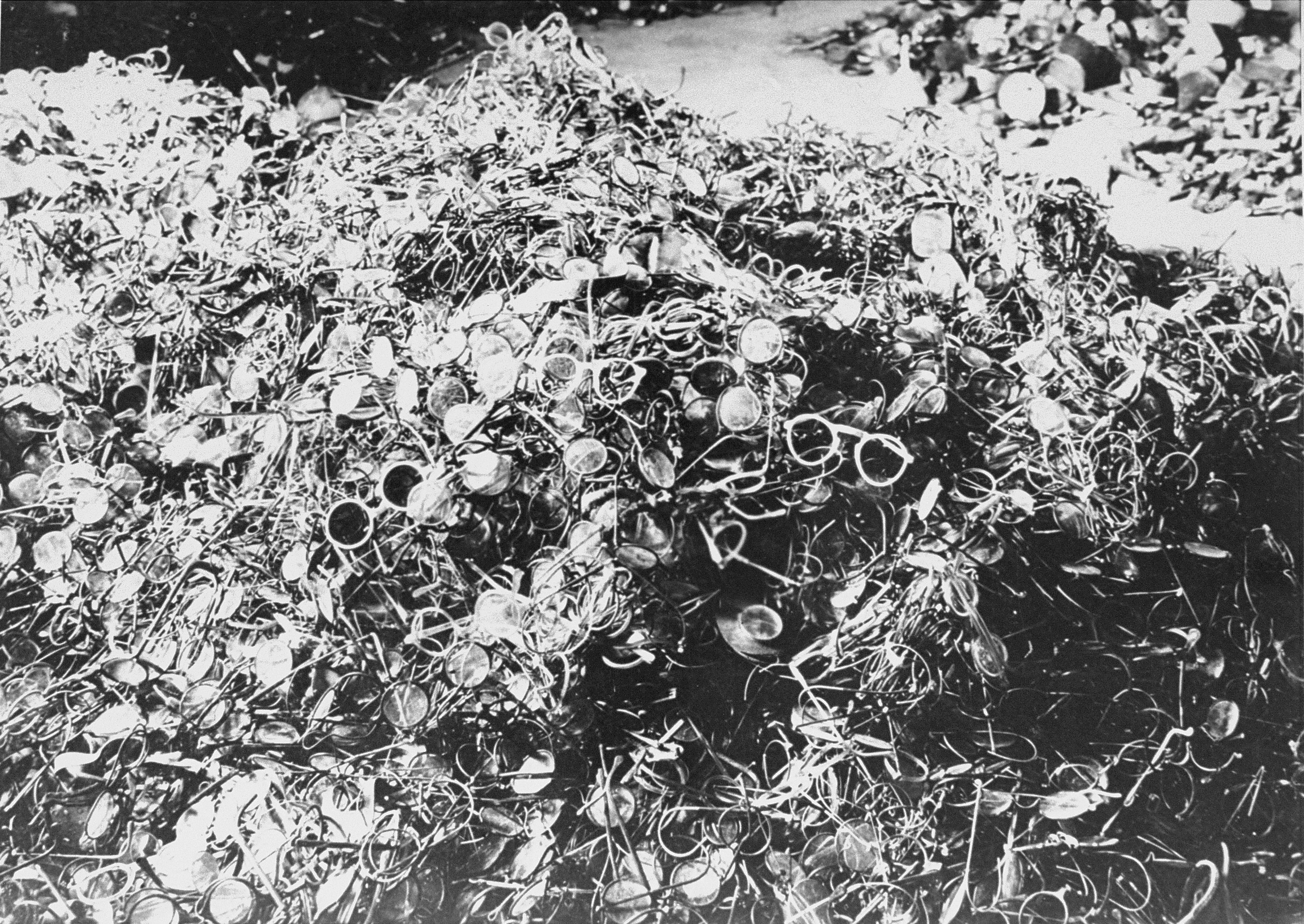
Eyeglasses of victims at Auschwitz concentration camp.

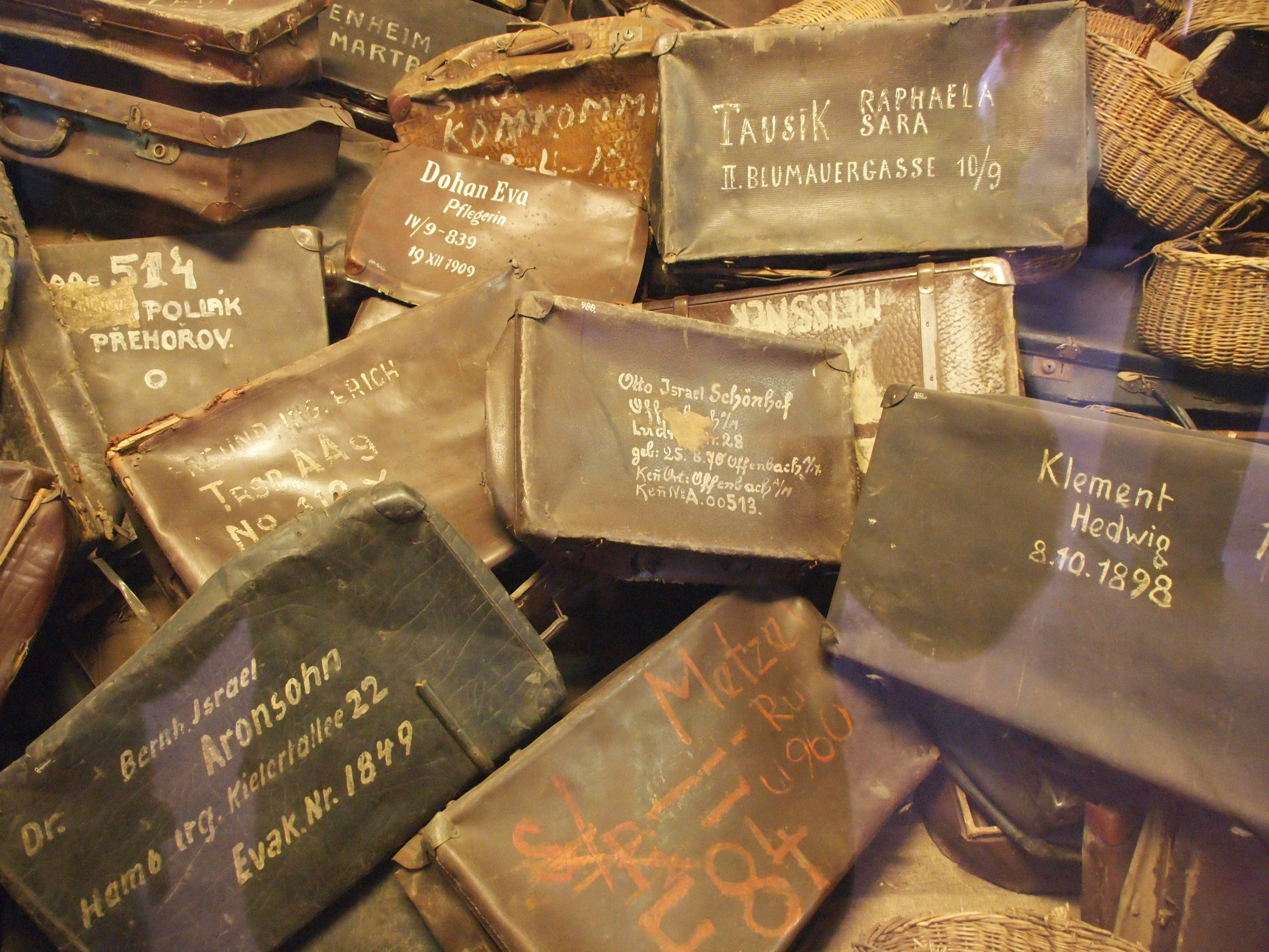
Luggage taken from victims at Auschwitz.

Funk was tried with other Nazi leaders at the Nuremberg trials. He was accused by Allied prosecutors of having been closely involved in the state confiscation and disposal of the property of German Jews, of conspiracy to commit crimes against peace, the planning, initiating and waging wars of aggression, war crimes, and crimes against humanity. Funk argued that, despite his employment titles, he had very little power in the Nazi regime. He did however, admit to signing the laws that "Aryanized" Jewish property and in that respect claimed to be "morally guilty". At the Nuremberg trials, American Chief Prosecutor Robert H. Jackson labeled Funk as "The Banker of Gold Teeth", referring to the practice of extracting gold teeth from Nazi concentration camp victims, and forwarding the teeth to the Reichsbank for melting down to yield bullion. Many other gold items were stolen from victims, such as jewellery, eyeglasses and finger rings. Other items stolen from the victims included their clothing, furniture, artwork, as well as any wealth in stocks, shares, businesses and companies. Such business assets were taken by aryanization with often large and profitable businesses sold for less than their true worth. The monetary proceeds of auctions of such assets as furniture were passed to the Reichsbank in Max Heiliger accounts for use by the Nazi state or the SS. Even the hair of the victims was taken by shaving either just before or just after their murder. When clothing was distributed after the victims were shot by the Einsatzgruppen, blood stains were often visible at and near the bullet holes.

Funk was clearly distressed during the proceedings and cried during presentation of evidence, such as the murders carried out in the concentration camps, requiring sleeping pills at night. Schacht relates that he, Funk and Franz von Papen formed a close intimate circle at Nuremberg, and that he felt Funk was unable to comprehend the serious nature of the duties which he had undertaken. Schacht believed that there were many matters of which Funk had no knowledge whatsoever and that he gave a poor performance in the witness box. However, Speer gave a different version of events. He said that when he first came into contact with Funk at Nuremberg "he looked extremely worn and downcast." But "Funk reasoned skillfully and in a way that stirred my pity" in the witness box.

Göring meanwhile described Funk as "an insignificant subordinate", but documentary evidence and his wartime biography Walther Funk, A Life for the Economy were used against him during the trial, leading to his conviction on counts 2, 3 and 4 of the indictment and his sentence of life imprisonment. Funk was held at Spandau Prison along with other senior Nazis.

== Later life and death ==
On 16 May 1957, Funk was granted compassionate release because of ill health, making last-minute visits to Speer, Rudolf Hess, and Baldur von Schirach before leaving the prison. On 31 May 1960, Funk died of complication from diabetes in Düsseldorf, West Germany.

== See also ==
- Auschwitz concentration camp
- Nazi plunder
- Oskar Groening
- Max Heiliger
