= Eisenwerke Oberdonau =

Main supplier of steel to German war industry during World War II

Eisenwerke Oberdonau (German for Iron Works of Upper Danube) was a large steel and iron producing company, a holding of several steel works in southern Germany. Created after the Anschluss of Austria, it formed the part of the so-called Reichswerke Hermann Göring AG cartel, the main supplier of steel and iron for the German war industry during World War II. It is also argued that it was the largest steel mill complex in Europe at that time.

The main steel factory in Linz supplied its products to the nearby factories of tank hulls and turrets at Sankt Valentin (so-called Nibelungenwerk). Throughout the war, the company also ran two sub-camps of the Mauthausen-Gusen concentration camp where it benefited from the slave labour of inmates held there.
