= Steyr-Münichholz subcamp =

Concentration camp

Coordinates: 48°03′23″N 14°26′56″E

The Steyr-Münichholz concentration camp was one in a number of subcamps of the Mauthausen-Gusen concentration camp in Upper Austria. Inmates were drawn from the main camp, in order to exploit their labor for producing arms in Steyr-Daimler-Puch corporation factories, and to build air-raid bunkers in the town of Steyr.

Roughly 300 Mauthausen-Gusen inmates had been doing construction work at the Steyr facilities since spring 1941, being transferred back and forth between Mauthausen and Steyr on a daily basis. Because of growing scarcity of workers skilled for the incipient manufacture of aircraft engines and ball bearings, in fall 1941 the Steyr-Daimley-Puch management began lobbying for the allocation of more aptly skilled concentration camp inmates, and the establishment of a local subcamp. On January 5, 1942, Georg Meindl, general manager of Steyr-Daimler-Puch and SS Brigadeführer wrote to the SS and Police Leader of the region, Ernst Kaltenbrunner:

„(...) should be, if possible, workers specialising in the metal trades, or otherwise workers that can be educated on the work with machines. The daily transfer of these inmates to Mauthausen does not only make necessary larger commitment of guarding personnel, but also diminishes the output of the inmates.“

The establishment of a subcamp on the premises of a detention facility in nearby Garsten was opposed by the prison administration. Therefore, a makeshift camp was established in the vicinity of the factory premises in spring 1942.

Most inmates originated from Spain, France, Poland, Italy, Greece, Russia, and Czechoslovakia. Their total number varied between 1,000 and 2,000. In April 1945 however, the number rose to 3,090, as several death marches with inmates from the Wiener Neustadt subcamp went through the town.

Many inmates died from malnutrition, working constantly at a fast pace irrespective of weather conditions, and lack of health treatment. A number were also killed in air raids on the Steyr factories in February and April 1944. The exact total number of deaths, however, remains unknown to this day. The names of 226 inmates show on the records of the city crematory. Inmates who went sick were usually sent back to be killed at the main camp at Mauthausen.

The camp was liberated by US troops on May 5, 1945.

The last remaining barracks (which had contained the camp's dining hall) were demolished by the private owner of the premises in 1993, before explorations into setting up a memorial had come to fruition, sparking outrage among concerned locals.
