= Max Heiliger =

Fictitious name

Max Heiliger was a false identity created during the Nazi era to establish bank accounts for laundering and fencing valuables stolen from those murdered in the Holocaust. Additionally, stolen artwork, and furniture from vacated homes of Holocaust victims was collected separately and auctioned; the resulting funds were then funneled into the same accounts. Its creation was authorized by Reichsbank president Walther Funk in a secret arrangement with Schutzstaffel leader Heinrich Himmler.

== Stolen property ==
Along with banknotes, items such as dental gold, wedding rings, jewelry, and even scrap gold melted down from eyeglasses flooded into the Max Heiliger accounts, completely filling several vaults by 1942. The valuables were stolen from Holocaust victims before and after transportation by train to Nazi concentration camps. The items were carefully weighed, evaluated, and inventoried by SS accountants before transfer to the Reichsbank accounts in Berlin. Furniture and artwork left in vacated apartments and houses were collected in a separate operation and auctioned to the German population, after which the generated funds were transferred to the accounts. What the Nazis considered "degenerate art" was often sent to Geneva for auction, although some art was retained by Hitler's art dealers, including Hildebrand Gurlitt. Stocks, bonds, and shares were transferred to the state in the same way, and companies were purchased for less than their true worth through Aryanization. The potential for corruption of such assets was substantial and an unknown amount of stolen wealth ended up in private pockets, notably with the Gurlitt Collection. Heiliger accounts were also sometimes used to fence valuables at Berlin's municipal pawn shops.

== Other code names ==
Other code phrases associated with bank-processing of camp victims' property included Melmer, Besitz der umgesiedelten Juden (property of resettled Jews), and Reinhardtfonds. The latter was a veiled reference to Operation Reinhardt. The word umgesiedelten cloaked the true nature of the goods, since victims were usually "resettled" to an extermination camp.

== Nazi cynicism ==
Using the name "Heiliger" was a cynical Nazi joke, since the word means saint, from the word heilig (holy). Such "humor" was not unusual in Nazi circles; for example, the one-way paths to the gas chambers at Sobibor and Treblinka death camps were called Himmelstrasse, meaning "Heaven Street" –the road to Heaven.

== See also ==
- Oscar Groening
- Ratlines (World War II)
