= Hiltrud Strasser =

German veterinarian (born 1943)

Dr. Hiltrud Strasser (born 1943, Leipzig, Germany) is a German veterinarian, who has worked for many years on the anatomy, physiology, pathology, and rehabilitation of horses' feet. She has published papers and books on this topic since the 1980s.

Her primary interest is foot balance and trimming, especially in relation to barefoot trimming and remedial trimming of foot conditions such as laminitis and navicular syndrome. As well as publishing papers and books she also runs courses for horse owners, farriers, and veterinarians in Europe and elsewhere. Her courses also concern the holistic care and rehabilitation of horses. Strasser's theory is based on the naturalization of a horse's management (no stalls, herd life and constant free movement), on de-shoeing of shod horses and on a trim devoted to restoring normal shape and function of their hooves.

She has also co-authored a recent book with Robert Cook, covering bitting injuries and other problems associated with horses' bits.

Critics of Dr. Strasser's method of hoof care allege that her methodology may result in lameness, pain, and discomfort. She herself outlines circumstances where her extreme trim could result in the death of the horse under some circumstances. For this reason, many mainstream practitioners hesitate to recommend the more extreme aspects of Strasser's methods.

== Bibliography ==
- A Lifetime of Soundness: The Keys to Optimal Horse Health, Lameness Rehabilitation, and the High-Performance Barefoot Horse., Strasser, H. and Kells, S., Third Edition (Revised). Self-published, Sabine Kells, Qualicum Beach, BC, Canada, 1998
- Shoeing: A Necessary Evil?, Strasser, H., Ed. & Trans. Sabine Kells, Self–published, Sabine Kells, Qualicum Beach, BC, Canada, 2000
- The Hoofcare Specialist’s Handbook: Hoof Orthopedics and Holistic Lameness Rehabilitation, Strasser, H and Kells, S, Self-Published, Sabine Kells, Qualicum Beach, BC Canada, 2001
- Who's Afraid of Founder - Laminitis Demystified: Causes, Prevention and Holistic Rehabilitation, Hiltrud Strasser, 2002
- Metal in the Mouth: The Abusive Effects of Bitted Bridles, W. Robert Cook & Hiltrud Strasser, 2002
- Welz, Yvonne (ed.). Barefoot Stories: Featuring the Strasser Method of Barefoot Horse Care, 2003.
