= Sankt Valentin =

- Municipality
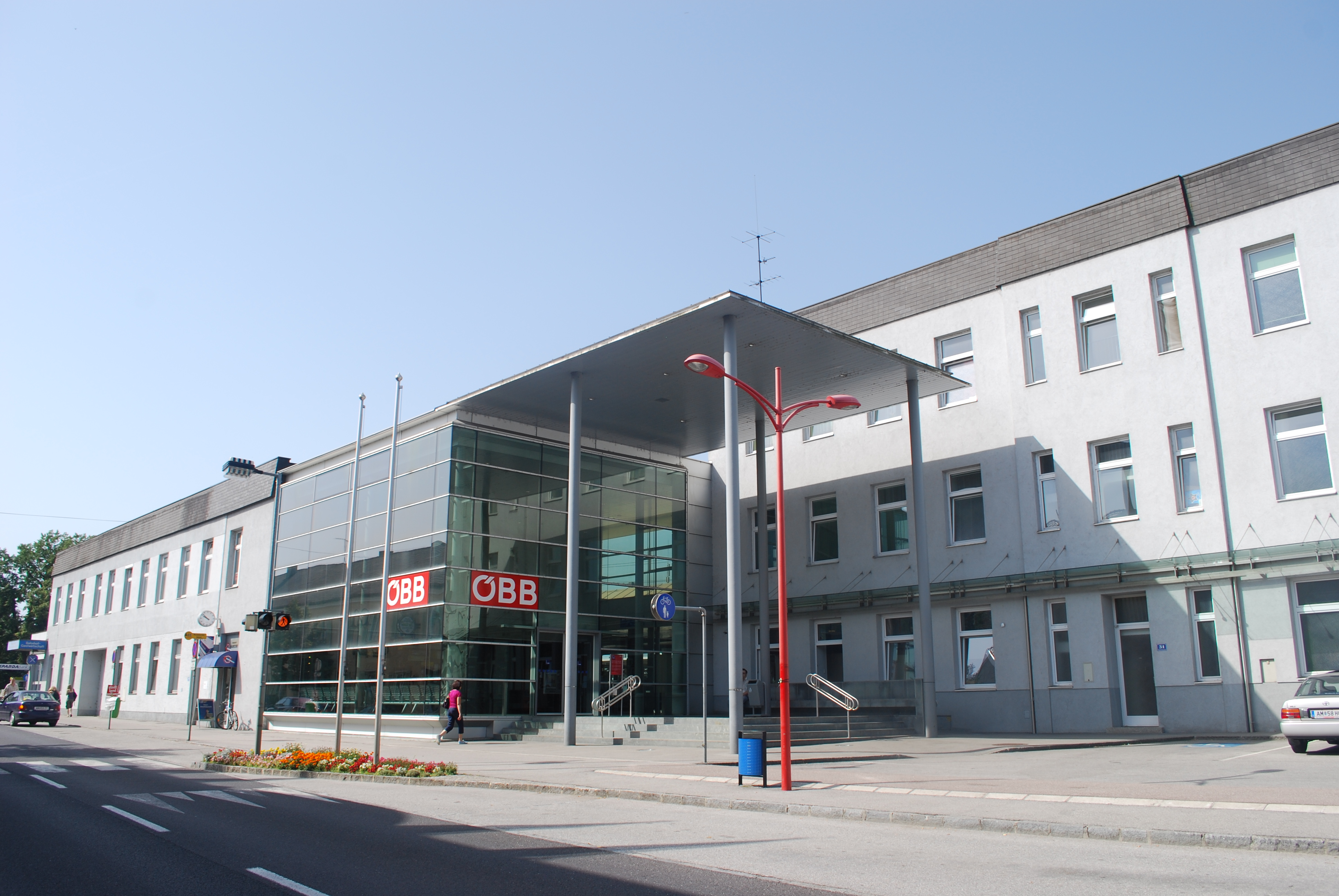
- Train station

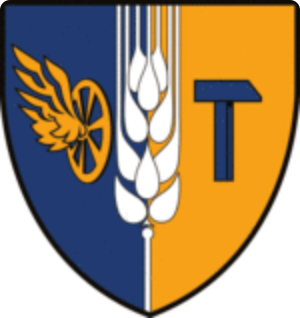
- Coat of arms

- Location within Austria
- Coordinates: 48°10′N 14°32′E
- Country: Austria
- State: Lower Austria
- District: Amstetten

Government
  - Mayor: Kerstin Suchan-Mayr (SPÖ)

Area
  - Total: 45.64 km^{2} (17.62 sq mi)
- Elevation: 272 m (892 ft)

Population (2018-01-01)
  - Total: 9,340
  - Density: 205/km^{2} (530/sq mi)
- Time zone: UTC+1 (CET)
  - Summer (DST): UTC+2 (CEST)
- Postal code: 4300
- Area code: 07435
- Vehicle registration: AM
- Website: sanktvalentin.at

Sankt Valentin or St. Valentin is a town in the district of Amstetten in Lower Austria in Austria. It is the westermost town of the district.

== Population ==
Historical population
Year	Pop.	±%
1869	2,616	—
1880	3,211	+22.7%
1890	3,235	+0.7%
1900	3,847	+18.9%
1910	4,269	+11.0%
1923	5,168	+21.1%
1934	5,312	+2.8%
1939	5,379	+1.3%
1951	7,135	+32.6%
1961	7,750	+8.6%
1971	8,715	+12.5%
1981	8,738	+0.3%
1991	7,873	−9.9%
2001	8,983	+14.1%
2011	9,195	+2.4%
