= Four Year Plan =

Series of economic measures in Nazi Germany

Document with letterhead Der Beauftragte für den Vierjahresplan / Der Generalbevollmächtigte ('The Commissioner for the Four Year Plan / The General Plenipotentiary'), concerning the requisition of a motorcycle in Amsterdam, 1942.

The Four Year Plan (German: Vierjahresplan) was a series of economic measures initiated by Adolf Hitler in Nazi Germany in 1936. Hitler placed Hermann Göring in charge of these measures, making him a Reich Plenipotentiary (Reichsbevollmächtigter) whose jurisdiction cut across the responsibilities of various cabinet ministries, including those of the Minister of Economics, the Defense Minister and the Minister of Agriculture. The Four Year Plan was part of the alternative governmental structure created by Hitler and the Nazi Party, which included entities such as Organisation Todt and the unification of the Schutzstaffel (SS) and the German police forces, including the Gestapo, under Heinrich Himmler.

The primary purpose of the Four Year Plan was to provide for the rearmament of Germany, and to prepare the country for self-sufficiency in four years, from 1936 to 1940. Aside from emphasizing the rebuilding of the nation's military defenses, in disregard of the restrictions imposed on Germany by the Treaty of Versailles after the German defeat in World War I, the Four Year Plan sought to reduce unemployment; increase synthetic fibre production, undertake public works projects, increase automobile production, and further develop the Autobahn system.

== Origins ==
In 1933, Hitler had laid down his foreign policy priorities as "natural antagonism" towards the Soviet Union. In the autumn of 1935, various business leaders complained to Hitler about the overwhelming costs of the rearmament, only for Hermann Göring to speak about the necessity of preparing for the coming war against the Soviet Union. The outbreak of the Spanish Civil War in July 1936 put Hitler into an apocalyptic mood in the summer of 1936 as he became convinced that a war with the Soviet Union would occur in the near-future. The diary of Josef Goebbels shows that a leitmotiv of Hitler's thinking in 1936 and 1937 was his conviction that Germany would have to take on the forces of "Judeo-Bolshevism" sooner rather than later.

== The Four Year Plan memo ==
In May 1936, in response to a growing crisis in the German economy caused by the strains of rearmament, Hitler issued the "Four-Year Plan Memorandum" ordering Göring to carry out the Four Year Plan to have the German economy ready for war within the next four years. During the 1936 economic crisis, the German government was divided into two factions with one (the so-called "free market" faction) centering around the Reichsbank President Hjalmar Schacht and the Price Commissioner Carl Friedrich Goerdeler calling for decreased military spending and a turn away from autarkic policies, and another faction around Göring calling for the opposite.

Historians such as Richard Overy have argued that the importance of the memo, which was written personally by Hitler, can be gauged by the fact that Hitler, who had something of a phobia about writing, hardly ever wrote anything down, which indicates that Hitler had something especially important to say. The "Four-Year Plan Memorandum" predicated an imminent all-out, apocalyptic struggle between "Judeo-Bolshevism" and German National Socialism, which necessitated a total effort at rearmament regardless of the economic costs. The basic premise of the Four Year Plan memo was that "the showdown with Russia is inevitable".

In the memo, Hitler wrote:

Since the outbreak of the French Revolution, the world has been moving with ever increasing speed toward a new conflict, the most extreme solution of which is called Bolshevism, whose essence and aim, however, are solely the elimination of those strata of mankind which have hitherto provided the leadership and their replacement by worldwide Jewry. No state will be able to withdraw or even remain at a distance from this historical conflict...It is not the aim of this memorandum to prophesy the time when the untenable situation in Europe will become an open crisis. I only want, in these lines, to set down my conviction that this crisis cannot and will not fail to arrive and that it is Germany's duty to secure her own existence by every means in face of this catastrophe, and to protect herself against it, and that from this compulsion there arises a series of conclusions relating to the most important tasks that our people have ever been set. For a victory of Bolshevism over Germany would not lead to a Versailles treaty, but to the final destruction, indeed the annihilation of the German people...I consider it necessary for the Reichstag to pass the following two laws: 1) A law providing the death penalty for economic sabotage and 2) A law making the whole of Jewry liable for all damage inflicted by individual specimens of this community of criminals upon the German economy, and thus upon the German people.

Hitler called for Germany to have the world's "first army" in terms of fighting power within the next four years and that "the extent of the military development of our resources cannot be too large, nor its pace too swift" (emphasis in the original) and the role of the economy was simply to support "Germany's self-assertion and the extension of her Lebensraum". Hitler went on to write that given the magnitude of the coming struggle that the concerns expressed by members of the "free market" faction like Schacht and Goerdeler that the current level of military spending was bankrupting Germany were irrelevant. Hitler wrote that: "However well balanced the general pattern of a nation's life ought to be, there must at particular times be certain disturbances of the balance at the expense of other less vital tasks. If we do not succeed in bringing the German army as rapidly as possible to the rank of premier army in the world...then Germany will be lost!" Along the same lines, Hitler wrote later in his memo: "The nation does not live for the economy, for economic leaders, or for economic or financial theories; on the contrary, it is finance and the economy, economic leaders and theories, which all owe unqualified service in this struggle for the self-assertion of our nation."

== Role of Göring ==
Hitler extended to Göring the power to make law simply by publishing decrees, which enabled him to create other plenipotentiaries in overall charge of various industries. Göring constantly expanded the scope of the plan until he became the de facto master of the German economy, and the Office of the Four Year Plan became, along with his control of the Luftwaffe as an independent armed service, the power base that he had lacked since the weakening of the other government positions that he held. Göring held no significant position in the Nazi Party, and his influence before he took on the Four Year Plan had been based primarily on his public popularity as a war hero and his easy access to Hitler.

The Reichswerke, an industrial conglomerate aimed at hastening growth in ore mining and steel output of Nazi Germany, a major piece of the Four Year Plan, was established and controlled by Göring.

Although the appointment of Göring as head of the plan had short-term benefits to Hitler, in the long term it was a disaster, as Göring knew next to nothing about economics, a factor that Hitler cited as one of the reasons for the choice.

== Methods ==
The Four-Year Plan favoured both the protection of agriculture and the promotion of autarky (economic independence) for Germany. Göring was put in charge of the Four-Year Plan at its inception and given plenipotentiary powers. He had complete control over the economy, including the private sector, especially after the Minister of Economics, Hjalmar Schacht, had begun to lose favour with Hitler for opposing the growing military expenditures at the expense of civilian economic growth. During the following years, the state, under the industrial conglomerate Reichswerke, began building refineries, aluminium plants, and factories for the development of synthetic materials.

The Four-Year Plan technically expired in 1940, but the "Office of the Four-Year Plan", a cabinet-level agency, had grown to such a power base that the plan was extended indefinitely.

== Global reaction ==
Rearmament was in direct violation of the strict terms set by the allies of World War I at the Treaty of Versailles. The German army was to be restricted to 100,000 men, and there were to be no conscription, tanks or heavy artillery or general staff. The German navy was restricted to 15,000 men and no submarines while the fleet was limited to 6 battleships (of less than 10,000 tonnes), 6 cruisers and 12 destroyers. Germany was not permitted an air force. Finally, Germany was explicitly required to retain all enlisted men for 12 years and all officers for 25 years so that only a limited number of men would have military training.

Following a tour of the German countryside in 1936, former British Prime Minister David Lloyd George said of the breach of the treaty that he had helped to formulate:

That Germany is rearming cannot be denied. After all the victors in the Great War except Britain disregarded their own disarmament pledges, the Führer abrogated the agreement which bound his own country, thus following the example of the nations who were responsible for the Versailles Treaty. It is today a commonly admitted part of Hitler's policy to develop an army strong enough to resist any attack, regardless of from which side it may come. I believe that he has already reached this point of inviolability.

In a September 1936 speech before the German Labor Front, Hitler explained the plan's focus and drew a comparison between the resources at Germany's disposal and those accessible to the "incapable" Bolsheviks. Some in the American press interpreted the speech as Hitler's call for war with the Soviet Union to obtain those resources. The correspondent for The New York Times put it this way:

There was no expression of a wish to acquire these resources and there was distinctly no threat. Yet when the cheers... had died away one was conscious that a thought had been cast into the pool of German mentality and that the ripples created by it might spread far indeed.

== See also ==
- Reichswerke Hermann Göring
- Five-year plans of the Soviet Union
