= Rudolf Bingel =

German entrepreneur (1882–1945)

Rudolf Bingel (2 June 1882 - 22 September 1945) was a German electrical engineer and executive who served as chairman of the executive board of Siemens-Schuckertwerke. The 'Bingelhaus' at 67 Werner-von-Siemens Strasse in Erlangen (housing some Siemens industrial departments) is named after him.

== Life ==
=== Education and rise through Siemens ===
His father Christian (15 February 1850 - 26 May 1905) ran an inn and moved to Wiesbaden from Langschied in the Taunus. His mother Marie Diefenbach (1847–1924) came from Laufenselden. Born in Wiesbaden, Bingel attended the engineering school at Bingen from 1904 to 1907, graduating with a degree in electrical engineering. In 1904 he married Frieda Joost, daughter of the hairdresser Karl Joost (1850–1904) and his wife Josefine Schmitt. The couple had no children.

He got his first job on August 1, 1907, at Siemens-Schuckert's factory in Mannheim and was promoted to chief engineer two years later. From then on, he focused on electrically powered cranes and their drives. In 1913, he became head of the industrial department, and the following year he was granted commercial power of attorney and joined the Technical Directorate. A few years later, he took on the role of director..

On 1 October 1924 he moved to Berlin as a deputy member of the firm's executive board. He was also made head of the shipbuilding department in 1926, in addition to his management duties leading the industrial department alongside Otto Krell. On 11 November 1927 he was made a full member of the firm's executive board, gaining an honorary engineering doctorate from the Technical University of Braunschweig in 1929. He was made the executive board's deputy chairman in 1937 and two years later its chairman.

=== Cooperation with the arms industry ===
The German invasion of Poland led to Bingel's first major contact with the Wehrmacht regarding war economics. On 18 December 1939 he attended a meeting of the OKW's Defence Economy and Armament's Office, to which Generalmajor Georg Thomas had invited him to give a lecture on the armament industry's united leadership. Other invitees to the meeting showed its importance - Paul Pleiger (Reichswerke Hermann Göring), Walter Borbet (Bochumer Verein für Gußstahlfabrikation AG), August Kotthaus (Carl Zeiss Jena), Bernhard Unholtz (Vereinigte Deutsche Metallwerke AG), Ewald Hecker (Ilseder Hütte AG), Martin Blank (Gutehoffnungshütte AG), Hermann Bücher (AEG), Heinrich Koppenberg (Junkers Flugzeug- und Motorenwerke), Hellmuth Röhnert (Rheinmetall-Borsig AG), Rudolf Siedersleben (Otto-Wolff-Konzern), Wilhelm Kissel (Daimler-Benz AG) and other major business leaders.

In his speech Bingel emphasized that the electrical industry occupied a key place in the armaments industry. Any disruption or delay in this area would impact industrial production in others, meaning that he believed that continuous contracting and the standardisation of wartime management were particularly important for the electrical industry. He emphasized the importance of maintaining reserves for production, as without them balancing production of such a complex apparatus would be unsustainable.

Bingel was also appointed to the Reichsgruppe Industrie (RI) and in that capacity took part in an RI meeting on 27 March 1940 which discussed the relationship between the RI and the Reich Minister for Armaments and Munitions Fritz Todt. This was also attended by several directors and managing directors of the Reich Chamber of Commerce, of the RI and of various business groups, including Wilhelm Zangen (RI), Rudolf Stahl (RI), Albert Pietzsch (Reich Chamber of Commerce), Philipp Keßler (Iron and Steel Association), Helmut Roehnert and Walter Borbet. At the meeting Bingel stated that he had talked with Todt and thus gained a good impression of him, arguing that Todt had no preconceived opinions and possessed "common sense". Bingel suggested so-called sponsorships to Todt, which would be understood as a special combination of general contractorship and a joint venture.

=== Supporting the SS ===
Bingel's important position in German industry also brought interest from the SS. Through Friedrich Kranefuß he had dealings with the Freundeskreis Reichsführer SS, for which he raised donations - for example, the banker Kurt von Schröder wrote a note to Heinrich Himmler on 21 September 1943 stating that Bingel had transferred a 100,000 Reichsmark donation to account "S".

In an affidavit to the Nuremberg Trials dated 5 August 1946, the head of the SS Economic and Administrative Main Office (SS-WVHA) Oswald Pohl stated that he knew Bingel personally thanks to his official duties and that Bingel had negotiated with SS-Obergruppenführer Richard Glücks, the head of Office Group D in the SS-WVHA, regarding the use of prisoners in factories. Bingel was captured by the Red Army in Berlin in 1945 and sent to the internment camp at Ketschendorf before being moved to the one at Gorzów Wielkopolski, dying at the latter.

== Memberships of supervisory boards and committees ==
- Board of the Deutsches Museum (1942-1945)
- Nederlandsche Apparate Frabrik Loneker (Hegelo)
- Erzgesellschaft zur Erschließung von Nichteisenmetallen (Berlin)
- Hamburg-Amerika Paketfahrt AG (HAPAG) (Hamburg)
- Board of the Verein Deutscher Eisenhüttenleute (Düsseldorf), now the Stahlinstitut VDEh

== Works ==
- Entwicklungslinien der wirtschaftlichen elektromotorischen Antriebe in der Industrie. In: VDI-Zeitschrift. 1930, S. 848–864.
- Die Elektrizität im Aufgabenkreis der deutschen Technik. Leipzig 1938.

== Bibliography (in German) ==
- Ernst Klee: Das Personenlexikon zum Dritten Reich. Frankfurt am Main 2003.
- Deutsches Zentralarchiv Potsdam, Film Nr. 1758 (OKW-Besprechung vom 18. Dezember 1939).
- Betriebsarchiv Carl Zeiss Jena Nr. W 22 (Besprechung der Reichsgruppe Industrie vom 27. März 1940).
- Erich Stockhorst: 5000 Köpfe. Wer war was im Dritten Reich. Arndt, Kiel 1998.
- Heinz Schumann, Heinz Kührich (Redaktion): SS im Einsatz. Berlin 1964.
- Tobias Bütow, Franka Bindernagel: Ein KZ in der Nachbarschaft. Köln 2003.
- Georg Wenzel: Deutscher Wirtschaftsführer. Lebensgänge deutscher Wirtschaftspersönlichkeiten. Ein Nachschlagebuch über 13000 Wirtschaftspersönlichkeiten unserer Zeit. Hanseatische Verlagsanstalt, Hamburg/Berlin/Leipzig 1929, DNB 948663294.
- Georg Siemens (1955). "Bingel, Rudolf". Neue Deutsche Biographie (in German). Vol. 2. Berlin: Duncker & Humblot. pp. 247–248. (full text online).
- Deutsche Biographische Enzyklopädie, Band 1. 2005.
- Reichshandbuch der deutschen Gesellschaft – Das Handbuch der Persönlichkeiten in Wort und Bild. Erster Band, Deutscher Wirtschaftsverlag, Berlin 1930, ISBN 3-598-30664-4
- Bingel hat ausgedient. In: Berliner Zeitung, 5. September 1995; Änderung der Straße mit dem Namen „Bingel“.

== External links (in German) ==
- Literature by and about Rudolf Bingel in the German National Library catalogue
- Bingel's biographical note on Fa. Siemens site
