= Karl Rasche =

German Nazi commander, lawyer and banker

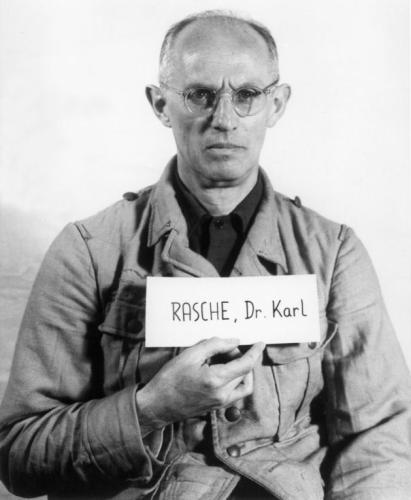
- Karl Rasche as a defendant
- Born: 23 August 1892; Iserlohn, German Empire
- Died: 12 September 1951 (aged 59); Basel, West Germany
- Occupations: SS-Obersturmbannführer, banker during the Third Reich
- Status: Deceased
- Convictions: War crimes Crimes against humanity Membership in a criminal organization
- Trial: Ministries Trial
- Penalty: 7 years imprisonment

Karl Emil August Rasche (23 August 1892 – 13 September 1951) was an SS-Obersturmbannführer and a Ph.D. in law as well as a board member and banker, later spokesman, of the Dresdner Bank during the Third Reich. On 11 April 1949 he was sentenced in a Ministries Trial to seven years in prison for his activities under the Nazis.

== Biography ==
=== Early career ===
Rasche studied economics and law in Münster, Munich, Leipzig, Berlin, and Bonn. At the outbreak of the First World War, he joined the army and fought on the Western Front. After being wounded in 1917 he wrote a dissertation with the title "The police concept in today's Prussian law with special attention to special laws" whilst in hospital. After the war he became involved in the Baltische Landeswehr, fundraising and recruiting volunteers. From July 1919 Rasche served as a court clerk in Hamm, but moved in 1921 to work at the Barmer Bank Corporation, where he became a rehabilitation specialist. From the beginning of 1933 he was a board member of the Bochum Westfalenbank AG, where he worked with Paul Pleiger.

=== During the Nazi period ===
In 1934 Rasche was appointed a deputy, and from August 1935, a full board member of the Dresdner Bank. His employment with Dresdner Bank had partly come through the intervention of Wilhelm Keppler. Together with another board member, Emil Heinrich Meyer, Rasche was considered a trusted banker of the SS. Though Rasche joined the Nazi Party in May 1933, his membership was not considered valid, as no membership card was issued or any membership fees paid. In August 1939 Rasche was retroactively awarded party membership from May 1937 and was given membership number 2,207,508. From 1933, Rasche was also a member of the German Labor Front (DAF), the Rechtswahrerbund (Lawyer's association), and the Nationalsozialistischer Reichsbund für Leibesübungen, the umbrella organisation for sports. During the 1936 Summer Olympics Rasche was deputy head of the Reich Office for professional athletics. Because of this role, he was introduced as a guest of honour to Adolf Hitler, the leader of the Nazi Party, and was introduced into the Freundeskreis Himmler by Fritz Kranefuss in the autumn of 1936. Rasche joined the SS (membership number 323,879) in May 1939 with membership retroactive to November 1938 as a Hauptsturmführer (SS Captain). After the Anschluss of Austria in 1938, Rasche became involved in the expansion of the banking business in Austria and later in the Sudetenland and Protectorate of Bohemia and Moravia. From the mid-1930s, he served as Chairman or Board member in the war effort and also led the business departments of the subsidiaries Handelstrust West NV (Amsterdam) and Continentale Bank SA (Brussels).

Towards the end of December 1942 he was promoted to CEO of the Dresdner Bank after a restructuring of the bank, together with Carl Lüer. In December 1943, he joined the Executive Group West in Bad Nauheim.

Rasche was involved in the negotiation of credit to the SS, which operated Nazi forced labor camps and concentration camps and financed the Germanisation programmes in occupied Eastern Europe. In banking, Rasche was also involved in Aryanization in the Netherlands and the Protectorate of Bohemia and Moravia. His participation in the Nazi regime is also demonstrated in the transfer of Czech arms factories to the Reichswerke Hermann Göring, which he carried out together with Hans Kehrl.

=== After the war ===
In April 1945 Rasche was arrested at Bad Nauheim and was placed in French captivity. He was questioned in Paris. Rasche was confined to the French occupation zone and his activity was limited to the "promotion of cross-border economic relations" for the French military government. In November 1945 Rasche was appointed to exchange information with the Office of Military Government, United States investigators in the American occupation zone. He was arrested immediately after his arrival in Frankfurt. He was imprisoned in Darmstadt after a stay in the prison in Frankfurt and in the 74th Ludwigsburg camp. From there he was transferred to the Dachau concentration camp, and finally was called to trial in April 1947 in the Nuremberg Trials.

As the only banker on trial from the private sector, Rasche was indicted on 4 November 1947 at the Ministries Trial, the eleventh set of trials to take place under the Nuremberg Trials. His counsel was Egon Kubuschok.

Regarding the seventh indictment of collaborating in slave labour, the prosecution could not prove conclusively whether Rasche had visited concentration camps or taken loans to pay for their building.

Rasche was released (early) in August 1950 from the Landsberg Prison for war criminals. In October/November 1950 Rasche was declared to have completed the denazification process. He was unable to resume work at the Dresdner Bank. In May 1951 representatives of the Bank agreed on a settlement for compensation and pension claims. Rasche continued working as a consultant and died as a result of a heart attack on a commuter train to Basel in September 1951.

== Work in supervisory boards ==
Chairman of the Supervisory Board

- 1938–1945: Perlmooser Cement AG, Vienna
- 1939–1944: Bohemian Escompte Bank, Prague (banking subsidiary Dresdner Bank)
- 1939–1944: Poldi Hütte AG, Prague
- 1941–1945: Commercial Credit Bank Ltd., Riga
- 1943–1945: West German Bodenkreditanstalt, Cologne
- 1943–1945: Tatra Werke AG, Prague
- Engelhardt-Brauerei AG Brewery, Berlin
- Hardy & Co. Ltd. Bank, Berlin

Vice-Chairman of the Supervisory Board

- 1944 Allgemeine Versicherungs AG, Vienna
- 1936–1945: Dyckerhoff Portland Cement AG, Mainz-Amöneburg
- 1939–1945: Rheinische rayon AG, Krefeld

Member of the Supervisory Board

- 1936–1945: Mülheim mining association
- 1936–1939: Junkers aircraft and engine plants AG
- 1937–1945: Winter Hall AG, Kassel
- 1937–1945: GEA Group AG, Frankfurt
- 1938–1944: Gerling Group Life Insurance AG, Cologne
- 1938–1945: Felten & Guillaume AG, Cologne
- 1938–1945: Coal AG of Essen, Essen
- 1938–1945: Country Bank Wien AG (subsidiary of Dresdner Bank)
- 1938–1945: Iron and Steelworks AG, Cologne-Beckum
- 1939–1945: Accumulatoren Factory AG, Hagen
- 1939–1945: Brno Arms Factory AG, Prague
- 1939–1944: Döhrener Werke AG, Hannover
- 1940–1944: Coal-Benzin AG (Brabag), Berlin
- 1940–1945: Continental Oil AG, Berlin
- 1940–1945: Škoda Works AG, Hanover
- 1940–1945: Rheinmetall AG, Düsseldorf
