= Otto Meissner =

Head of the Office of the President of Germany from 1920 to 1945 (1880–1953)

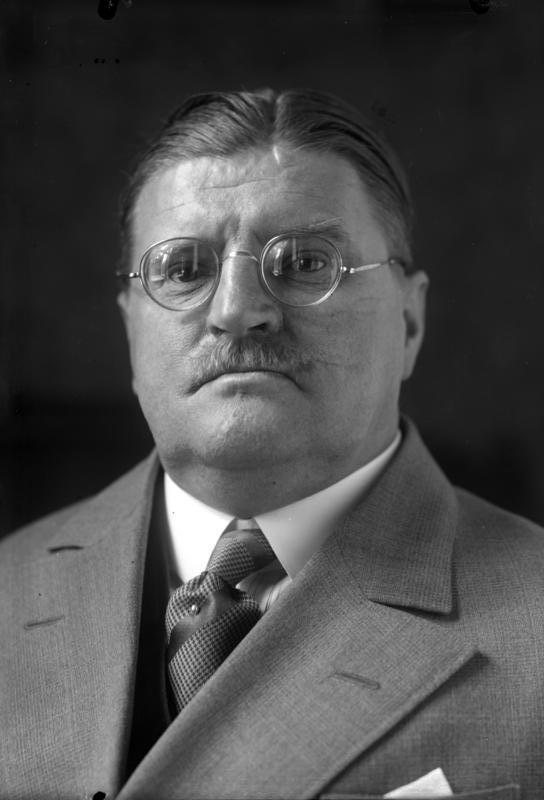
- Meissner in 1930

Leader of the Presidential Bureau, later Chief of the Presidential Chancellery
- In office 1 April 1920 – 23 May 1945
- President: Friedrich Ebert; Paul von Hindenburg; Adolf Hitler (as Führer); Karl Dönitz
- Preceded by: Rudolf Nadolny
- Succeeded by: Office abolished

Staatssekretär
- In office November 1923 – 1 December 1937

Staatsminister
- In office 1 December 1937 – 23 May 1945

Personal details
- Born: 13 March 1880 Bischwiller, Alsace-Lorraine, German Empire
- Died: 27 May 1953 (aged 73) Munich, West Germany
- Occupation: Lawyer; Civil servant

Military service
- Allegiance: German Empire
- Branch/service: Imperial German Army
- Unit: 136th Infantry Regiment
- Battles/wars: World War I
- Awards: Iron Cross

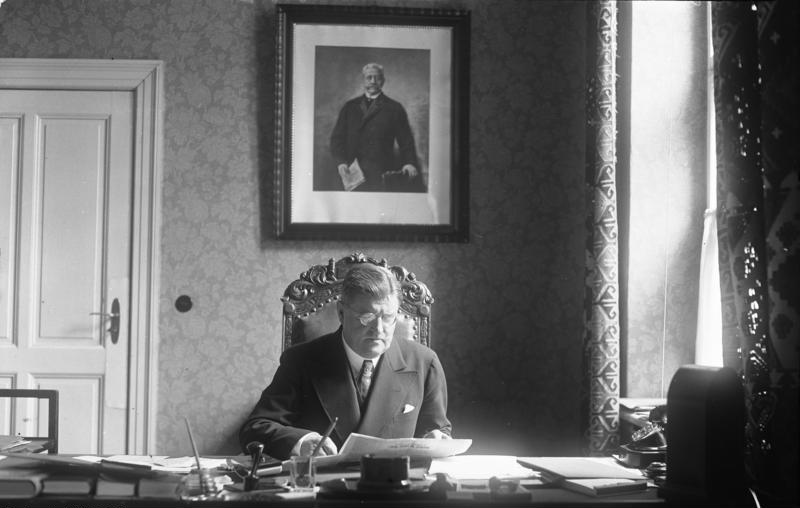
Otto Meissner in 1928

Otto Lebrecht Eduard Daniel Meissner (13 March 1880 – 27 May 1953) was head of the Office of the President of Germany from 1920 to 1945 during nearly the entire period of the Weimar Republic under Friedrich Ebert and Paul von Hindenburg and, finally, under the Nazi government under Adolf Hitler.

== Life ==
The son of a postal official, Meissner studied law in Straßburg from 1898 to 1903, where he also became a member of the Straßburg Student Youth Fraternity (Burschenschaft) Germania. Later, he also studied in Berlin and earned his Doctor of Laws in 1908, at the age of 28, in Erlangen, Bavaria. Afterward, he became a bureaucrat for the national railroad, the Reichsbahn, in Straßburg. Between 1915 and 1917, he participated in the First World War in the 136th infantry regiment. Until 1919 he was more active behind the front as a military railroad official, first in Bucharest, then in Kyiv. He was then accepted into the diplomatic service and from 1918 acted as a German chargé d'affaires to the very shortlived Ukrainian government in Kiev.

=== Ebert presidency (1920-1925) ===
Thanks to his good contacts, in 1919, Meissner became Acting Advisor in the "Bureau of the Reichspräsident", who was then the Social Democrat Friedrich Ebert, and by 1 April 1920, Meissner had risen to Ministerial Director and Leader of the Bureau. Ebert raised Meissner to the rank of State Secretary (Staatssekretär) in November 1923.

=== Hindenburg presidency (1925-1934) ===
Meissner continued in the post of State Secretary when Paul von Hindenburg was elected as Ebert's successor in 1925. Meissner, who lived with his family in the palace of the German president between 1929 and 1939, undoubtedly enjoyed major influence upon the presidents, especially Hindenburg. Together with Kurt von Schleicher and a few others, Meissner, in 1929 and 1930, furthered the dissolution of the parliamentary system by means of a civil presidential cabinet.

His role in the appointment of Hitler to chancellor from December 1932 to January 1933 remains a controversy among historians. As a member of the "camarilla", Meissner was certainly no small influence as State Secretary because of his close relations with Hindenburg. Together with Oskar von Hindenburg and Franz von Papen, Meissner organized the negotiations with Hitler to depose von Schleicher and to appoint Hitler to the post of Chancellor. For the Nazis' part, the talks were facilitated through Wilhelm Keppler, Joachim von Ribbentrop and the banker Kurt Freiherr von Schröder, a former officer and head of the old-guard conservative "Herrenklub" (Gentlemen's club) in Berlin in which von Papen was also active. Neither Hitler nor Hindenburg, as of the end of 1932, would have initiated contact with each other, so great was their mutual distaste.

Meissner submitted his resignation in 1933 but it was refused.

=== Nazi period (1934-1945) ===
When Hitler merged the functions of head of state (the president) and head of government (the chancellor) in August 1934, Meissner's office was renamed the "Presidential Chancellery" and restricted in its responsibilities to representative and formal matters of protocol, while all more political matters were assigned to the Reich Chancellery under the direction of Hans Lammers. Meissner was also made a member of the Academy for German Law. To mark the fourth anniversary of the Nazi regime on 30 January 1937, Hitler personally conferred the Golden Party Badge upon several non-Nazi members of the Reich government, including Meissner (membership number 3,805,235). On 1 December 1937, Meissner was promoted to Minister of State (Staatsminister) and Chief of the, now again renamed, "Presidential Chancellery of the Führer and Chancellor". He was granted status equal in rank to a Reichsminister, but without the title.

=== Post-war ===
After the Second World War, Meissner was arrested by the Allies and interrogated as a witness during the Nuremberg Trials. In July 1947, he appeared as a character witness for the accused former State Secretary Franz Schlegelberger. Meissner was finally prosecuted in the Wilhelmstrasse Trial, but the court acquitted him on 14 April. Two years later, in May 1949, he was accused again, this time in Munich, and was adjudged a fellow traveler. His appeal was turned down, but the proceedings were called to a halt in January 1952.

In 1950, Meissner published a memoir covering his unusual bureaucrat's career in a book, State Secretary under Ebert, Hindenburg and Hitler. The writer Hans-Otto Meissner (1909–1992) was his son.

== List of works ==
- Die Reichsverfassung. Das neue Reichstaatsrecht für den Praktischen Gebrauch, Berlin, 1919
- Das neue Staatsrecht des Reichs und seiner Länder, Berlin, 1921
- Grundriß der Verfassung und Verwaltung des Reichs und Preußens nebst Verzeichnis der Behörden und ihres Aufgabenkreises, Berlin, 1922
- Staatsrecht des Reichs und seiner Länder, Berlin, 1923
- Staats- und Verwaltungsrecht im Dritten Reich, Berlin, 1935
- Deutsches Elsaß, deutsches Lothringen. Ein Querschnitt aus Geschichte, Volkstum und Kultur, Berlin, 1941
- Elsaß und Lothringen, Deutsches Land, Verlagsanstalt Otto Stollberg, (324 pages), Berlin, 1941
- Staatssekretär unter Ebert, Hindenburg, Hitler. Der Schicksalsweg des deutschen Volkes von 1918 – 1945. Wie ich ihn erlebte, Hamburg, 1951

== Sources ==
- Karl Dietrich Bracher, Die Auflösung der Weimarer Republik. Eine Studie zum Problem des Machtverfalls in der Demokratie, ISBN 3-7610-7216-3
- Ernst Klee: Das Personenlexikon zum Dritten Reich. Wer war was vor und nach 1945, Fischer-Taschenbuch-Verlag, Frankfurt-am-Main, 2007, ISBN 978-3-596-16048-8
- Heinrich August Winkler, Weimar. 1918–1933. Die Geschichte der ersten deutschen Demokratie, ISBN 3-406-44037-1
- Robert S. Wistrich, Who's Who in Nazi Germany, Macmillan Publishing Co., 1982, ISBN 0-02-630600-X
