= Friedrich Reinhart =

German banker (1871–1943)

Supervisory Board Chairman Commerz- und Privat-Bank
- In office July 1934 – 3 October 1943
- Preceded by: Franz Heinrich Witthoefft
- Succeeded by: Paul Marx

Additional positions
- 1938–1943: Wehrwirtschaftsführer
- 1933–1943: Prussian State Council
- 1933–1943: Academy for German Law

Personal details
- Born: 23 February 1871 Darmstadt, Grand Duchy of Hesse, German Empire
- Died: 3 October 1943 (aged 72) Seefeld, Bavaria, Nazi Germany
- Profession: Banker

Friedrich "Fritz" Reinhart (23 February 1871 – 3 October 1943) was a German bank executive, financier and supporter of the Nazi Party. He was the chief executive officer of the Commerz- und Privat-Bank from July 1934 until his death in October 1943. He was also a member of the executive and advisory boards of multiple business and industrial enterprises, including the Reichsbank and the Deutsche Reichsbahn. Reinhart was a signatory of the Industrielleneingabe (industrial petition) to the Reich president which strongly advocated for the appointment of Adolf Hitler as chancellor. After the Nazis came to power, he was a member of the Freundeskreis der Wirtschaft and was named a Wehrwirtschaftsführer (military economy leader).

== Early life and banking career ==
Reinhart was born in Darmstadt in 1871 and, after attending Volksschule, began an apprenticeship at the Darmstädter Volksbank in 1885. From 1892 to 1895, he worked there as a deputy cashier. In 1905, he transferred to the Württembergische Landesbank and became a board member. After it merged with the Dresdner Bank, Reinhart went to work for the Mitteldeutsche Creditbank of Frankfurt and Berlin as a director and member of the management board (Vorstand) from 1910 to 1929. After a merger with Commerz- und Privat-Bank, he became a member of its management board from 1929 to July 1934 when he became chairman of its supervisory board (Aufsichtsrat), essentially its chief executive officer. In the latter year, he became president of the Berlin stock exchange. During the banking crisis of 1931, he vehemently criticized Germany's indebtedness due to its reliance on short-term foreign loans.

On 12 February 1935, Reinhart became president of the Berlin Chamber of Industry and Commerce. On 14 March 1935, be was named head of the Chamber of Commerce for the Brandenburg Economic District. This was followed, on 11 October 1935, by his appointment to the presidium of the German Institute for Banking Science in Berlin. In December 1937, he joined the administrative council of the Hamburg World Economic Institute. He was named to the advisory board of the Deutsche Reichsbahn on 7 November 1939 and, on 1 January 1943, he became the president of the Berlin-Brandenburg district Chamber of Commerce. During these years, he was also a member of the executive boards of multiple business and industrial enterprises, as well as the central committee of the Reichsbank.

== Political activity in the Weimar years ==
In an attempt in January 1920 to get a number of banks to support the Kapp Putsch against the government of the Weimar Republic, Reinhart expressed his approval in writing. As a conservative and a German nationalist, Reinhart was sympathetic with the rising fascist movement of the 1920s and joined the Society for the Study of Fascism (Gesellschaft zum Studium des Faschismus), which included many other prominent conservative business leaders and economists, such as Hjalmar Schacht, Fritz Thyssen, Walther Funk and Waldemar Pabst. On 21 October 1931, Reinhart was among 25 leaders of industry, banking, labor and agriculture who were named by Reich President Paul von Hindenburg to an economic advisory board to address problems in the German economy. The board was charged with deciding the manner and degree to which prices and wages would be reduced in accordance with Reich Chancellor Heinrich Brüning's deflationary policy. Subsequently, Reinhart published an article in the Frankfurter Zeitung on 8 February 1932, launching a campaign for German economic self-sufficiency and calling for rearmament and imperialism.

Reinhart also belonged to the Keppler circle, a study group initially of about a dozen business and industry leaders originally formed as an economic study group by Wilhelm Keppler early in 1932 at the suggestion of Adolf Hitler. On 19 November 1932, along with Schacht and Thyssen, Reinhart was one of the 19 signatories of the Industrielleneingabe (industrial petition) to Hindenburg, which strongly advocated for the appointment of Hitler as chancellor.

== Career in Nazi Germany ==
After the Nazi seizure of power, Reinhart in April 1933, was appointed to the Generalrat der Wirtschaft (General Economic Council), a short-lived group of industrialists, bankers and politicians established to advise the government on matters related to the economy. It met on 20 September of that year to hear an address by Hitler but was abolished by a law of 23 March 1934. On 11 July 1933, Prussian Minister President Hermann Göring made Reinhart a founding member of the recently reconstituted Prussian State Council. On 3 October 1933, he also became a founding member of Hans Frank's Academy for German Law. Reinhart continued as a member of the Keppler Circle which was expanded, renamed the Freundeskreis der Wirtschaft (Circle of Friends of the Economy) and, after 1935, became closely associated with Reichsführer-SS Heinrich Himmler. Sometimes referred to as Heinrich Himmler's Circle of Friends, it provided substantial financial contributions to SS enterprises. In 1938, Reinhart was named a Wehrwirtschaftsführer (military economy leader). He died in Seefeld, a suburb of Munich in October 1943.

== Sources ==
- Friedrich Reinhart entry in the Deutsche Biographie
- Klee, Ernst (2007). Das Personenlexikon zum Dritten Reich. Wer war was vor und nach 1945. Frankfurt-am-Main: Fischer-Taschenbuch-Verlag. ISBN 978-3-596-16048-8.
- Lilla, Joachim (2005). Der Preußische Staatsrat 1921–1933: Ein biographisches Handbuch. Düsseldorf: Droste Verlag. ISBN 978-3-770-05271-4.
- Zentner, Christian; Bedürftig, Friedemann, eds. (1997) [1991]. The Encyclopedia of the Third Reich. New York: Da Capo Press. ISBN 978-0-306-80793-0.
