= Emil Heinrich Meyer =

German businessman

Emil Heinrich Meyer (6 May 1886 in Wiesbaden – 9 May 1945 in Berlin) was a German business executive. Meyer was a board member at the ITT Corporation's Germany-based subsidiaries Standard Elektrik Lorenz and Mix & Genest as well as AEG.

Meyer was a cousin of the industrialist Wilhelm Keppler and became a member of the Freundeskreis der Wirtschaft, a group of industrialists committed to racialism and close to far right politics, led by Keppler. The group supported the Nazi Party, which Meyer joined in 1933. He was one of three directors of the Dresdner Bank, the others being Karl Rasche and Fritz Kranefuss, to belong to the exclusive Freunde des Reichsführer-SS circle, a development of Keppler's group. As such he had the courtesy rank of Standartenführer in the SS. In 1935 he was made an honorary professor for Genossenschaftswesen at the prestigious Handelshochschule Berlin as well as a member of the Nazi Academy for German Law.

During the latter stages of the Second World War, Meyer was involved in Ostindustrie GmbH, a forced labour enterprise attached to the SS Main Economic and Administrative Office set up by Oswald Pohl in the General Government area of Poland in 1943. Meyer committed suicide in Berlin in 1945.

== Sources ==
- Johannes Bähr: Die Dresdner Bank im Dritten Reich, Oldenbourg Wissenschaftsverlag, 2006 (co-authors: Ralf Ahrens, Michael C. Schneider, Harald Wixforth, Dieter Ziegler; see especially first volume, p. 92/93)
