= Industrielleneingabe =

1932 petition in Germany

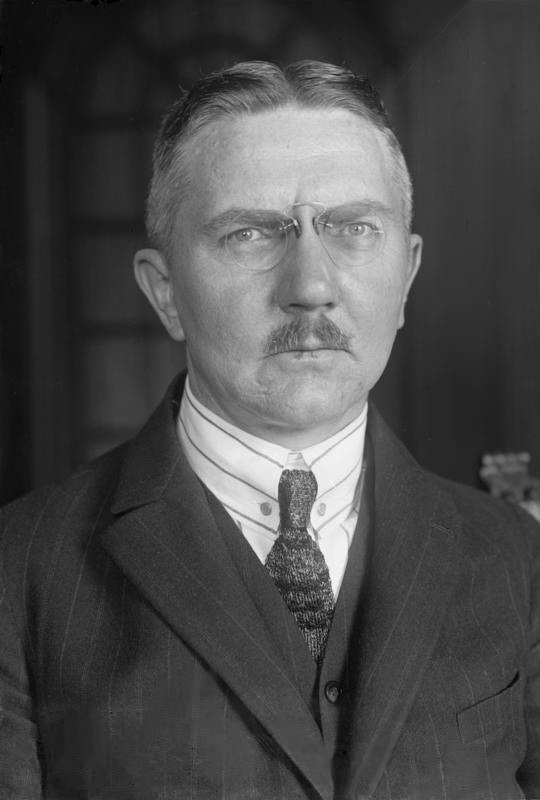
Hjalmar Schacht, the main drafter of the Industrielleneingabe

The Industrielleneingabe (English: Industrialists' petition) was a petition signed by 19 representatives of industry, finance, and agriculture on 19 November 1932 that requested for German President Paul von Hindenburg to make Adolf Hitler the German Chancellor.

There had already been two similar petitions recommending that a government be formed by the Nazi Party: a petition by the Wirtschaftspolitische Vereinigung Frankfurt (Frankfurt Socio-economic Union) on 27 July 1931, and a declaration by 51 professors published in July 1932 in the Nazi Party newspaper Völkischer Beobachter.

The idea for the Industrielleneingabe had emerged at the end of October 1932 in the Freundeskreis der Wirtschaft (or "Keppler circle"; Keppler-Kreis) and was supported by Heinrich Himmler, who worked as a liaison to the Brown House. The drafting of the letter was aided especially by Hjalmar Schacht, who was the only member of the Keppler-Kreis with any significant political experience. The Industrielleneingabe was first published in 1956 in the Zeitschrift für Geschichtswissenschaft and has been used as evidence to support the idea that big business played a central role in the rise of the Nazi Party.

== Signatures ==
The sixteen initial signatories were:

- Hjalmar Schacht, former president of the Reichsbank, member of the Keppler circle
- Friedrich Reinhart, board spokesman of the Commerzbank, board member of AEG, president of the Berlin Chamber of Industry and Commerce, member of the Keppler circle
- August Rosterg, CEO of Wintershall AG, member of the Keppler circle
- Kurt Baron von Schröder, private banker from Cologne, member of the Keppler circle and the Deutscher Herrenklub (de). Several weeks later in his house, the decisive negotiations took place before Hitler's appointment as German Chancellor.
- Fritz Beindorff, owner of Pelikan AG, member of the supervisory board of Deutsche Bank
- Emil Helfferich, member of the board of the German-American Petroleum Company, Chairman of the Supervisory Board of HAPAG, member of the Keppler circle
- Franz Heinrich Witthoefft, Chairman in the Board of Commerzbank and Privat-Bank, president of the Hamburg Chamber of Commerce, member of the Keppler circle
- Ewald Hecker, president of the Hanover Chamber of Commerce and Industry, member of the Keppler circle
- Kurt Woermann, shipowner from Hamburg and member of the NSDAP
- Carl Vincent Krogmann, co-owner of the Hamburger Bank, shipping company Wachsmuth, and trading house Krogmann, board member of the Hamburg National Club, mayor of Hamburg from 1933 to 1945, member of the Hamburg Chamber of Commerce and the Keppler circle
- Kurt von Eichborn, co-owner of a private bank in Breslau
- Eberhard Graf von Kalckreuth, president of the Reichslandbund, member of the Deutscher Herrenklub
- Erich Lübbert, senior executive of Dywidag, chairman of the AG für Verkehrswesen, member of the Economic Council in Der Stahlhelm
- Erwin Merck, supervisor of H. J. Merck & Co., a Hamburg commercial bank
- Joachim von Oppen, president of the Brandenburg Chamber of Agriculture
- Rudolf Ventzki, general director of Maschinenfabrik Esslingen

Signatures of the following personalities were submitted afterwards:

- Fritz Thyssen, chairman of the Supervisory Board of the Vereinigte Stahlwerke
- Robert Graf von Keyserlingk-Cammerau, member of the board of the German agricultural employers' associations, member of the German men club
- Kurt Gustav Ernst von Rohr-Manze, landowner

Whether Engelbert Beckmann, the president of the Westphalian Land Association, signed in any form is controversial. Historians Eberhard Czichon and Reinhard Kühnl list him as a signer. According to Gerhard Schulz, his signature was never seen by Hindenburg. Henry A. Turner speaks only of 19 signatures.

== See also ==
- Business collaboration with Nazi Germany
- Circle of Friends of the Economy
- List of companies involved in the Holocaust
- Secret Meeting of 20 February 1933
