= Freundeskreis der Wirtschaft =

German industrialists linked with Nazi Party

The Freundeskreis der Wirtschaft (English: Circle of Friends of the Economy), which became known as Freundeskreis Reichsführer SS (also Freundeskreis Himmler) after the Nazi seizure of power, or "Keppler Circle", was a group of German industrialists whose aim was to strengthen the ties between the Nazi Party and business and industry. The group was formed and co-ordinated by Wilhelm Keppler, one of Adolf Hitler's close economic advisors.

== Early development ==
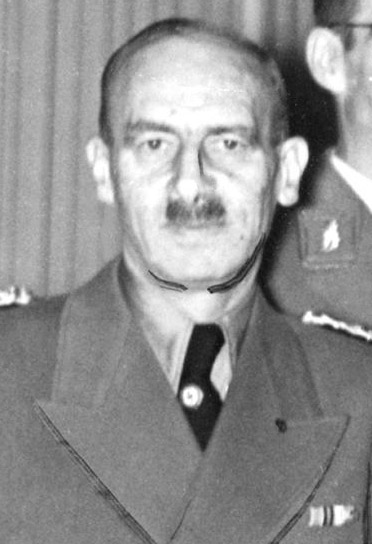
Wilhelm Keppler

Keppler, who had been a member of the Nazi party since 1927, formed the Circle after Hitler's request in 1932 for the formation of a "study group on economic questions". Members were not initially expected to be party members (though many later joined the party), and portrayed the group as "palaver" and an "innocuous gentleman's club". The size of the group never exceeded 40 members. Groups represented included manufacturing, banking, and Schutzstaffel (SS) officials.

The group became associated with Heinrich Himmler, a friend of Keppler, beginning in 1935.

== Impact ==
Historians have argued that the membership of the group was not particularly influential, with few members from large industry. Motivations for group members may have included strong anti-labor and anti-socialist positions, rather than pro-Hitler positions as such. However, even scholars who are skeptical of the influence of the group note them as part of late-Weimar industrial leadership’s “opposition to parliamentary democracy”.

From 1936 to 1944, the members of the circle donated approximately 1 million Reichsmark a year to Himmler for uses "outside the budget". One use of the money was to fund the Ahnenerbe, which conducted Aryan historical and eugenicist research. Money from the group was also used to provide expenses and pay off debts of SS members which helped incentivize action by the otherwise-underpaid SS.

At least some members of the group, such as Friedrich Flick, later benefited from the NSDAP's policy of aryanization of Jewish-owned competitors. Membership in the group may have also played a role in allocation of concentration camp labor to industrial concerns.

It also sponsored the Jewish skull collection, when 86 victims were selected at Auschwitz, then murdered using Zyklon B gas at Natzweiler concentration camp and the corpses shipped to Reichsuniversität Straßburg for defleshing and ultimately public display by Professor August Hirt. The project stopped at this stage when Germany lost the war.

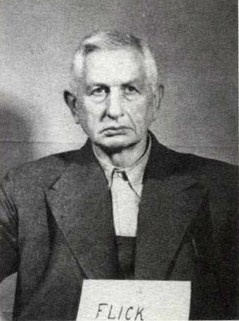
Friedrich Flick during the Nuremberg Trials

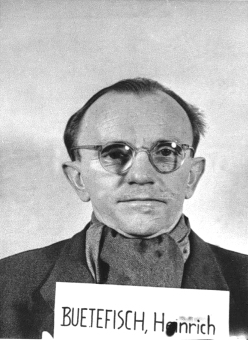
Heinrich Bütefisch in charge at Monowitz works

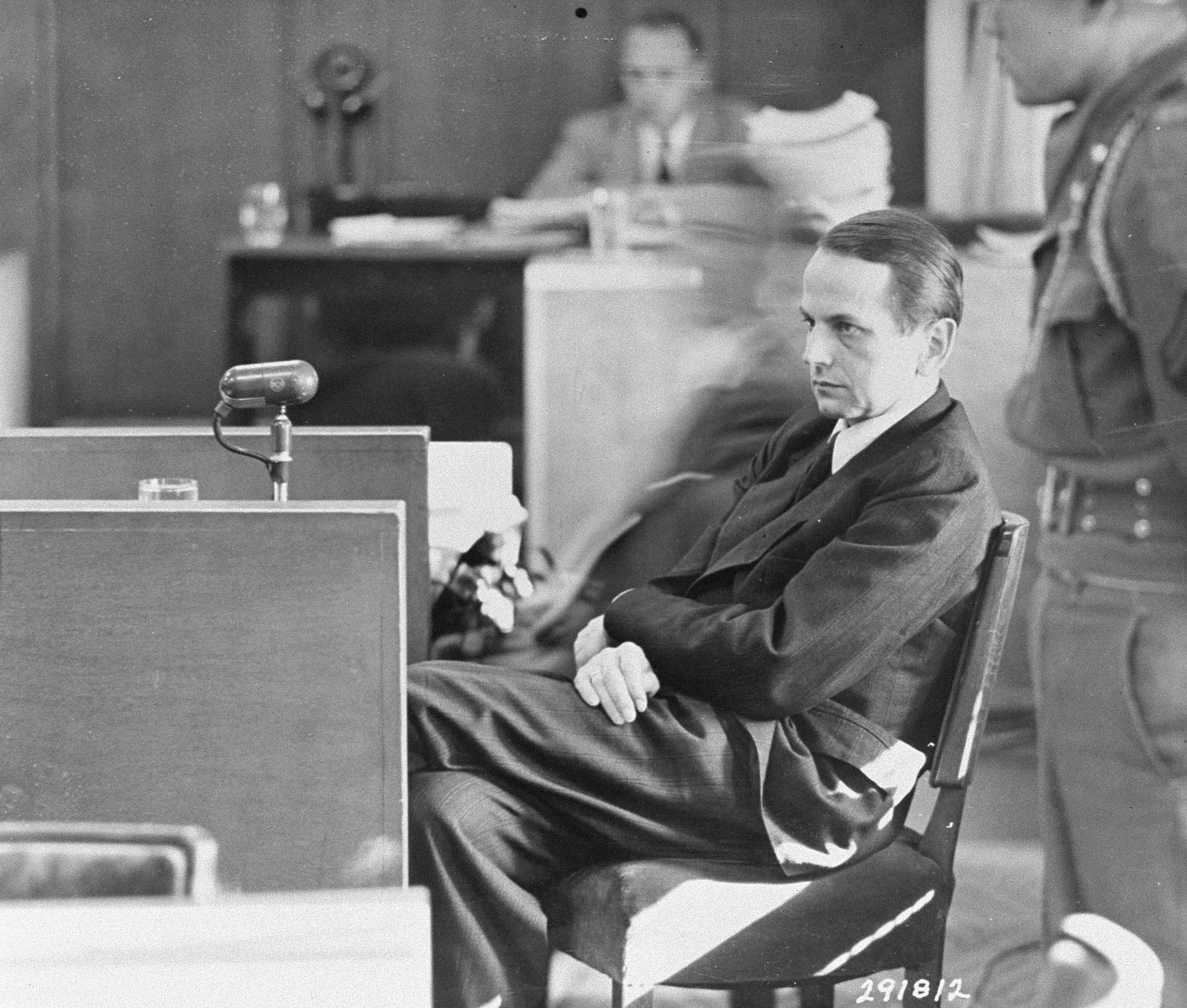
Otto Ohlendorf testifies at the Einsatzgruppen trial, 9 October 1947.

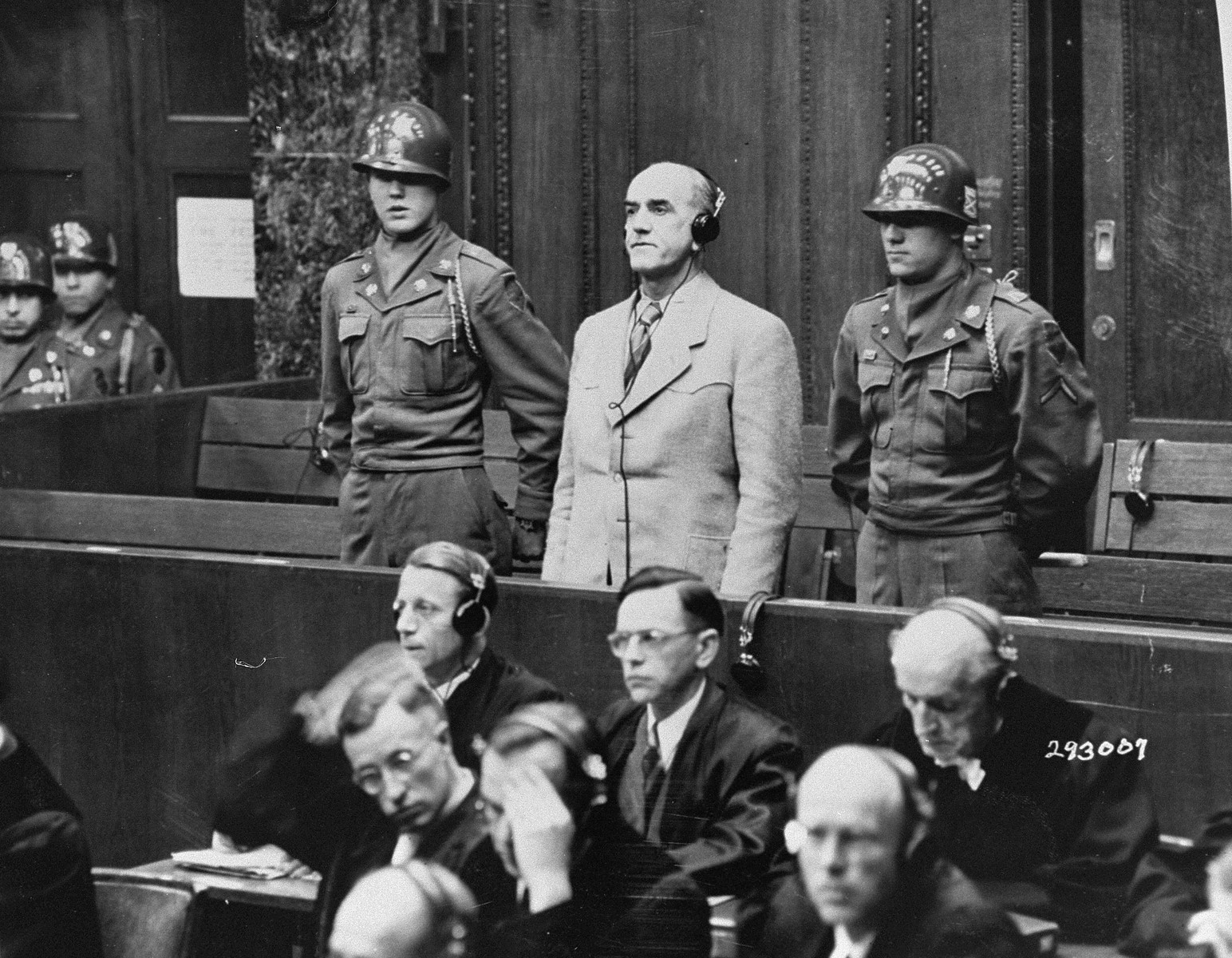
Oswald Pohl receives his sentence of death by hanging at Nuremberg trials.

== Members ==
Members of the group included:

From manufacturing:

- Fritz Kranefuss, Keppler's nephew and member of the board at Brabag (committed suicide at the end of the war)
- Kurt Baron von Schröder and Emil Heinrich Meyer, ITT Corporation executives
- August Rosterg, the General Director of Wintershall
- Otto Steinbrinck, the vice-president of Vereinigte Stahlwerke AG (sentenced to 5 years at the Flick trial, and died in prison in 1949)
- Emil Helfferich, board chair of the German-American Petroleum Company
- Friederich Flick, chair of Flick KG (sentenced to 7 years at the Flick trial, and released from prison in 1950)
- Ewald Hecker, chair of Ilseder Hütte
- Albert Vögler, of Vereinigte Stahlwerke (committed suicide at the end of the war)
- Heinrich Bütefisch, of IG-Farben
- Karl Lindemann, of Norddeutsche Lloyd
- Hans Walz, head of Robert Bosch GmbH (honored by Yad Vashem as one of the Righteous Among the Nations for his work to save Jews from the Holocaust)
- Richard Kaselowsky, manager of Dr. Oetker (killed in an air raid in 1944.)
- Emil Heinrich Meyer, board member (committed suicide at the end of the war)

From banking:

- Hjalmar Schacht, president of the Reichsbank
- Karl Rasche, board member of the Dresdner Bank
- Friedrich Reinhart, chairman of the board at Commerzbank

From politics and the SS:

- Carl Vincent Krogmann and Gottfried Graf von Bismarck-Schönhausen, political figures
- Oswald Pohl, head of the Administrative and Economic office of the SS (executed in 1951)
- Franz Hayler and Otto Ohlendorf, of the Reich Group for Commerce and Trade
- group secretary Fritz Kranefuß, a former employee of Keppler's and member of Himmler's personal staff
- group financial manager Kurt Baron von Schröder
- Keppler (sentenced to 10 years in prison at the Ministries Trial at Nuremberg in 1949, and released in February 1951)

== See also ==
- Adolf Hitler Fund of German Trade and Industry
- Industrielleneingabe
- Private sector participation in Nazi crimes
- Secret Meeting of 20 February 1933
- Nazi secret meeting in Strasbourg 1944
