= Fritz Kranefuss =

German industrialist

Friedrich Carl Arthur Kranefuß (19 October 1900 in Herford – 1945), known as Fritz Kranefuß, was a German industrialist and a Wehrwirtschaftsführer (Military Economy Leader) in the Third Reich.

Kranefuss was on the board of Braunekohle-Benzin AG (Brabag), a conglomerate of chemical firms and collieries concerned with the production of synthetic fuel. He joined the Nazi Party in 1932.

He was one of three directors of the Dresdner Bank, the others being Karl Rasche and Emil Heinrich Meyer, to belong to the exclusive Freunde des Reichsführer-SS circle. Kranefuss had been introduced to Heinrich Himmler by his uncle Wilhelm Keppler's Freundeskreis der Wirtschaft, although it was Kranefuss' idea to make the movement more specific to Himmler. As a consequence it was Kranefuss who was chosen as head of the circle. His involvement in the circle also entitled him to the Schutzstaffel rank of Brigadeführer. He also helped to ensure that BRABAG became one of the leading users of forced labour during the Second World War. Towards the end of the war Kranefuss, a well-connected international businessman, was also used by Himmler to open unofficial channels of contact with the Allies. At the war's end Kranefuss destroyed all the "Friends of Himmler" files and killed himself to keep its secrets.
