= Operation Safehaven (1944–1948) =

Allied intelligence program

Project Safehaven
Date	1944-1948
Location	Europe, Pacific, Atlantic, Indian Ocean, South-East Asia, China, Middle East, Mediterranean, North Africa, Horn of Africa, Australia, briefly North and South America

Project Safehaven (1944–48) was an intelligence program developed by the United States during the Second World War to prevent Nazi Germany and Axis partners of the Third Reich from hiding assets, in particular in neutral countries, for use after the war The program was designed and carried out by the US partnered with the United Kingdom and France. The program began in 1944 with Nazi defeat looming and evidence that Germany was covertly transferring sources of capital to neutral countries to escape war reparations and potentially aid a resurgence of the regime in the post-war period.

The central goal of Project Safehaven was to ensure Germany would not be able to start another war, with the specific aims of the program articulated in the spring of 1944. The short-term aims focused on identifying and locating German assets and blocking the transfer of German assets to neutral countries, and the long-term aims involved persuading neutral countries to turn over German assets as war reparations to ensure the restoration of Europe. The overall objective of the operation was to dissipate Nazi wealth in order to render any possible post-war resurgence controllable and to make it impossible for Germany to start another war.

Project Safehaven begun with communications in May 1944 from the Foreign Economic Administration (FEA) to the U.S. Department of State and the Department of Treasury, with an interagency program put forward. Throughout the course of the project, interagency conflict existed regarding which of the three agencies was in charge.

The Bretton Woods Conference, which took place in New Hampshire in July 1944, assisted in building a legal base for the Safehaven project. The Bretton Woods Resolution VI was officially accepted on July 22. Resolution VI outlined aims stating that neutral nations were to take immediate action to prevent the transfer and concealment of assets from Axis locations to neutral countries

Negotiations took place between the Allied forces and the neutral nations concerning the Safehaven project's objectives. Germany depended on trade with neutral nations throughout the Second World War, importing numerous goods and raw materials from Sweden, Turkey, Switzerland, Spain and Portugal Bargaining over trade with Allied nations with the neutral nations was one of the economic warfare instruments used by the Allied nations to prevent the transfer of German assets to neutral countries.

== Background ==
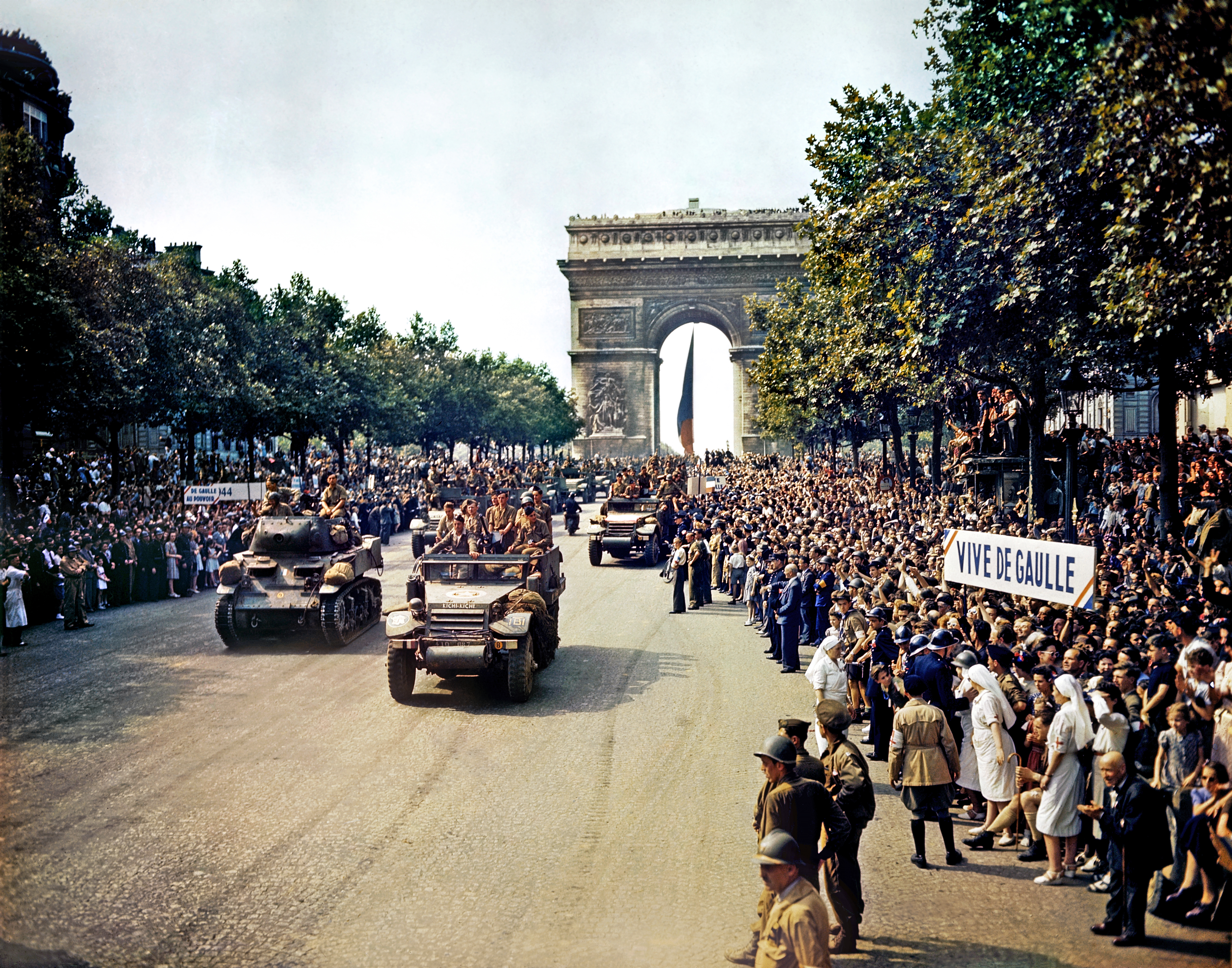
Liberation of Paris in 1944

Allied Victory in 1945 was the result of the co-existence of a variety of factors. The success of the attack at Normandy on D-Day was of great significance for allied victory and forced the German Wehrmacht to defend the western front, diverting German resources from the eastern front, subsequently weakening the strength of the army. The initial assault on Normandy by the allies on 6 June 1944, also known as ‘D Day’, employed 50,000 troops and 12,000 aircraft to successfully capture beaches and consolidate positions in the Normandy pocket through aerial bombardment and barrage. By mid-July 1944, the allies were firmly established in Normandy and ready to break out, allowing them to liberate Paris in just 6 weeks on 25 July. D-Day and the liberation of France as a strategy were instrumental to the success of Operation Bagration, the Russian counter-offensive, which forced Hitler to open up new fronts. By the end of February 1944 Army Group North had been defeated and the German siege of Leningrad was lifted, a sign of the commencement of the Russian counter offensive. Operation Bagration, pioneered by General Zhukov was launched in June 1944 and employed 1 million men and 2 thousand aircraft to encircle and destroy the German Army Group Centre, which pushed the Germans into retreat and liberated eastern Europe. Allied bombing of Germany, which intensified in 1944, was also a successful program in the air war which forced Germany to divert soldiers and resources to the home front and focus artillery production away from offensive operations. This drained Germany's resources and weakened Germany's capacity to wage war whilst simultaneously placing the allies in a position of power.

== Origins of the Safehaven Project ==
By 1944, the Allied forces had a high likelihood of defeating the German Nazis, forcing them to start preparing precautionary measures, like Project Safehaven, against a resurgence of Nazi power. As allied victory had been secured, the United States wanted to ensure the Nazi's would never be able to regain power again. There were great fears within the US State department and the Central Intelligence Agency (CIA) of a fourth Reich being established by the Nazis in the future. Project Safehaven was established in response to these fears with its overall objective to conduct intelligence on the location of Nazi assets and wealth in an attempt to cease it and steer it towards allied powers.

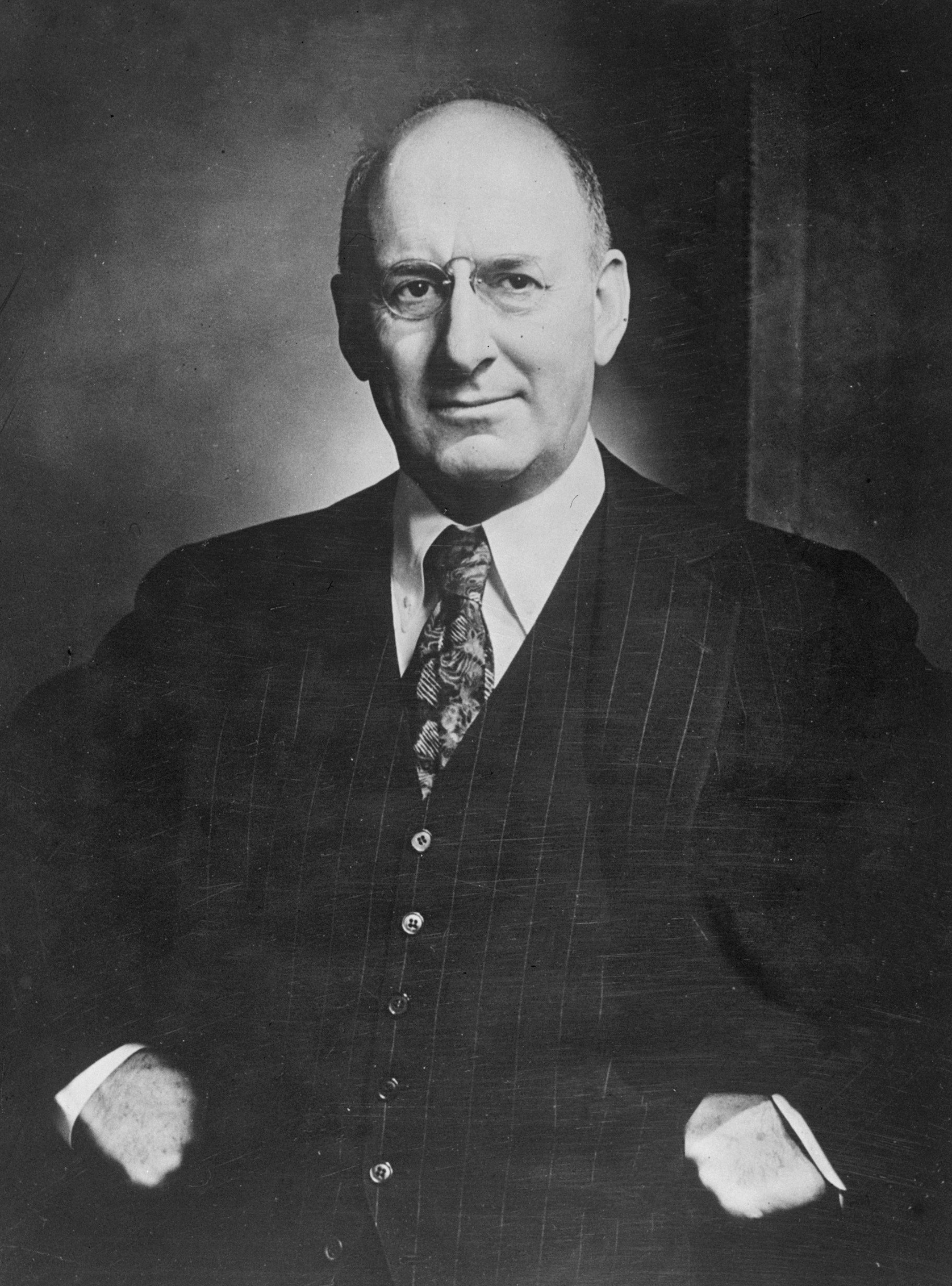
Pictured: Henry Morgenthau Jr, the United States Secretary of the Treasury in 1947

The project was first proposed by the Director of the Foreign Economic Administration (FEA), Leo T. Crowley on May 5, 1944 in a letter to the United States Secretary of the Treasury, Henry Morgenthau Jr. Then on 15 May in a letter to Livingston T. Merchant, the FEA suggested an interagency program, collaborating with the British and other US agencies with a vested interest in the aims of the program to locate and intercept the transfer of German assets into neutral nations. In the letters, Leo T.Crowley, director of the Foreign Economic Administration, proposed an active investigation take place to identify the extent to which German assets were being moved to neutral nations.

Samuel Klaus, special assistant to the Treasury Departments Special Counsel, led an information-gathering trip to Europe to examine the situation in neutral nations Klaus and his associates travelled to Lisbon, Stockholm, London and other countries in Europe advocating for the adoption of the programs aims. The objective of the trip was to supply information to Washington regarding German efforts to transfer assets to neutral nations, which Klaus established in his final report in 1944. Inner bureaucracies between the Foreign Economic Administration, Department of State and Department of Treasury predominated the trip, at times the Treasury Department was deliberately excluded from participation.

=== The FEA, Department of State and Department of Treasury ===
Discourse existed between the FEA, Department of State and Department of Treasury regarding who controlled the Safehaven project. The Special Areas Branch of the Foreign Economic Administration retained important information about the wartime economic activities of Germany and the neutral nations and proposed the initial idea of the Safehaven project. In 1944, a number of Foreign Economic Administration departments commenced formulating the program. Conflict arose between the Foreign Economic Administration and the Treasury and State Department as each agency claimed responsibility and authority over the program.

== Bretton Woods Resolution VI ==
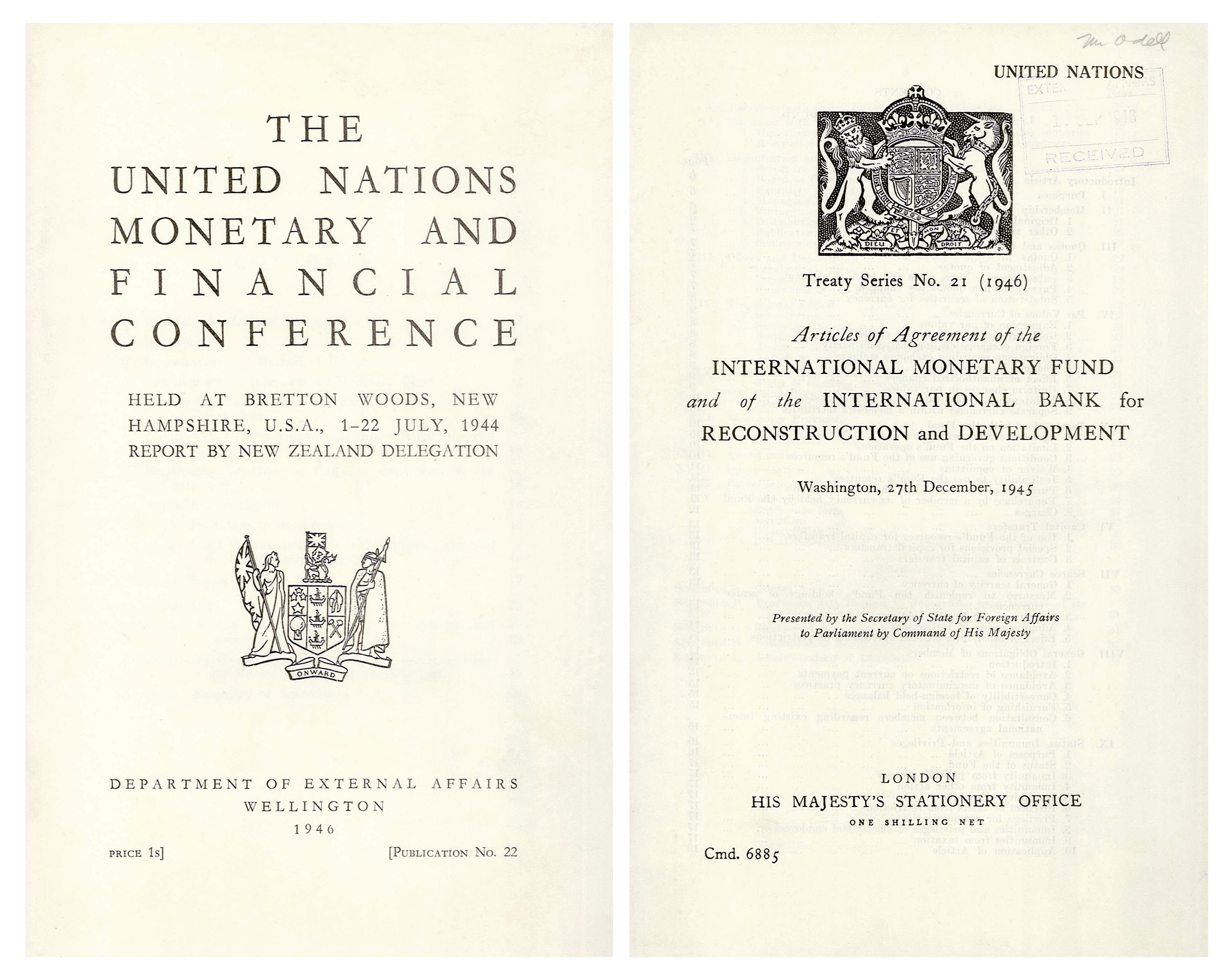
The United Nations Monetary and Financial Conference held at Bretton Woods, New Hampshire on 1–22 July 1944.

The United Nations Monetary and Financial Conference in Bretton Woods, New Hampshire, was held in July 1944 and involved forty-four countries. The conference was organised for the purpose of nations deciding upon a series of rules for the international monetary system post World War II. Three commissions made up the Bretton Woods Conference, with two commissions concerned with the final plans for the international monetary fund and with the primary interest of the Treasury and State Departments, the proposed World Bank, and the Stabilisation Fund. Commission III was concerned with residual matters, establishing various ad hoc committees, including a committee focused on enemy assets, looted goods and associated matters.

The French and Polish delegates submitted proposals to this third commission, with the Polish proposal calling on neutral countries to block and liquidate Axis assets and the French proposing steps be taken to prevent Germany from successfully secreting funds under false names in neutral nations. The United States presented an alternative draft proposal which incorporated features of both the French and Polish proposals, leading the Polish and French to withdraw their proposals. The British assistant undersecretary of state for foreign affairs, Sir Nigel Bruce Ronald, initially opposed the US proposal on the grounds that the subject of the proposal was outside the scope of the conference. A lack of opposition from other countries led Britain to relent in its objection. The final text was presented to the Plenary Session of the Conference and was officially adopted on July 22 as the Bretton Woods Resolution VI. The first aim of the resolution stated that neutral nations were to take immediate action to prevent the transfer of assets from Axis locations to neutral countries. The second aim stated that neutral countries were to prevent the concealment of German assets.

Resolution VI provided Project Safehaven with the legal base necessary to pursue its aims. In September 1944 the US sent directives to neutral countries as well as those nations that had partaken in the Bretton Woods Conference to stress the urgency in establishing procedures that would achieve the goals of Resolution VI.

Urgent action was taken by the US and Britain following the approval of Resolution VI. The British Ministry of Economic Warfare formed a Safehaven division that worked with American officials to merge the intelligence collected. The US and UK went on to direct their embassies in neutral countries to implement strategies that aligned with the goals of Resolution VI.

== Methodology ==
Project Safehaven was first conducted by gathering economic intelligence. In 1944 the US State Department invited the British Operations Support System (OSS) to collaborate and consolidate resources.

=== The Office of Strategic Services (OSS) and Project Safehaven ===
Office of Strategic Services Insignia

The OSS Office of Strategic Services (OSS) had been collecting economic intelligence since 1942 in efforts to acquire direct information on potential methods of German evasion of post war control. The responsibility of the Office of Strategic Services was primarily to assemble and analyse information gathered from the informants under its control. The Secret Intelligence (SI) Branch of the Office of Strategic Services was tasked with project Safehaven as information collection fell within the division's scope. The Office of Strategic Services counter-intelligence branch, X-2, acquired a central role alongside SI, due to the nature of the program as both an effort to stop post-war German economic penetration in neutral countries as well as a data collection operation.

The addition of the Safehaven project resulted in a redirection of classified information for the Office of Strategic Services, who had been gathering information on German economic activities to comprehend the war economy from 1942. Key Office of Strategic Services foreign stations located in Portugal, Switzerland and Spain, worked to uncover German efforts to obtain assets in neutral countries.

In April 1945, X-2 was operating in Switzerland and delivered a comprehensive analysis to the Office of Strategic Services in Washington detailing currency and gold transfers by Nazi's during the war that were arranged via Switzerland. In this summary, methods of transfers were described, including smuggling, undercover exchanges, sale of valuables and various others. X-2 reported in 1945 that warehouses in Sweden held German goods that had been transformed from 100 million Swedish kronor in gold and currency.

The extensive information gathered by the Office of Strategic Services regarding the Safehaven program justified a formalised treatment of the program in the ranks of the Office of Strategic Services in 1945. This is evidenced in Edward Buxton, the Acting Director of Strategic Services, announcement signalling the Office of Strategic Services make a significant contribution to the program. Station Chiefs in different regions were required to document their current situation concerning the Safehaven program. An Economic Intelligence Collection Unit was established in Washington to synthesise Safehaven reports and improve the direction of Office of Strategic Services contribution.

Project Safehaven leaders also researched into the escape of Nazi leaders themselves and investigated how the movement of assets correlated with the movements of Nazis in South America. Research into ratlines and the involvement of airline KLM were conducted to assist in the tracking of Nazi's and their assets.

== Negotiations with neutral nations ==
Neutrals sustained independence during the Second World War by extending economic concessions to those engaged in war. Neutrals military strength compared to that of the belligerents was lesser and by providing concessions the likelihood of maintaining independence during WWII increased.

Throughout the Second World War Germany relied upon neutral nations to provide sources of raw materials and resources. Germany was supplied with wolfram ore from Spain and Portugal, arms and ammunition from Switzerland, cobalt ore from Turkey and ball-bearings and iron-ore from Sweden.

Negotiations over trade and economic relations took place between the neutral nations and the Allied forces. The London Declaration of January 1943 and The Gold declaration of February 1944 was a combined US-British approach to prevent neutral nations from trading with Germany. The declarations provided a formal warning about trading in plunder and loot to the neutral nations.

The Treasury aimed to conduct a “hard” approach towards negotiations concerning Safehaven project requirements of neutral countries, whilst the State and British counterparts encouraged a “soft” approach be taken to limit endangering the war trade agreements.

=== Switzerland ===
Switzerland provided Germany with considerable extended credits for their purchases during the initial stages of the war when Germany had expended majority of its economic resources. Germany utilised Switzerland for the transit of goods through the Alp-tunnels, for purchase of ammunition and machinery, for laundering of looted gold and purchase of other goods and services.

German assets in Switzerland were approximated by US officials to equal as much as 1 billion in 1945. The types of assets Germany transferred to Switzerland included; gold, other precious metals, bearer stocks and bonds, US dollars and Swiss francs. Majority of the German assets in Switzerland were illicitly acquired and disguised to conceal their holder. Methods of obscurement including; under-invoicing exports and over-invoicing imports, holding assets externally, rather than in financial institutions, assigning assets into third party accounts, misrepresenting original assets and falsifying residential status. Obscurement methods aimed to render the assets untraceable, ensure assets were readily movable and obtained their perceived worth.

Switzerland reduced its exports of machinery, ammunition and other goods to Germany in August 1944 as a result of negotiations with the US and UK. Further negotiations led to a total ban on war material exports to Germany and Italy in Autumn.

=== Sweden ===
Swedish dealings with Germany were primarily in ball-bearings and iron-ore exports. In 1944 the US and Britain called for measures to identify and prevent the transfer of German external assets be taken by Sweden, in line with the aims of the Safehaven project. The US sought Swedish support by proposing the possibility of a renewed trade agreement. The Swedish Government stated actions would be taken to assist post-war recovery in Europe in September 1944 in line with the Safehaven programs.

=== Spain ===
Spain were initially reluctant to cooperate in Operation Safehaven. The Spanish government refused to extradite German officials to Allied countries as it conflicted with its neutrality and sovereignty. As Spain posed the largest threat to a resurgence of Nazi power, this was particularly alarming and discouraging for the Allies. On May 3, 1948 the Allies and Spain reached an agreement over the liquidation of German property assets in Spain which became known as the Allied- Spanish Safehaven accord. This accord specified that Spain agreed to turn over 101.6 kilograms of looted Nazi gold, in exchange for the Allies publicly acknowledging that Spain had not been aware of their acquisition of said gold. On November 3, 1948, in compliance with the Gold Declaration of February 22, 1944, the American embassy in Madrid reported that the gold had been deposited in the Foreign Exchange Institute, demonstrating Spain's commitment to the Safehaven accord.

=== Turkey ===
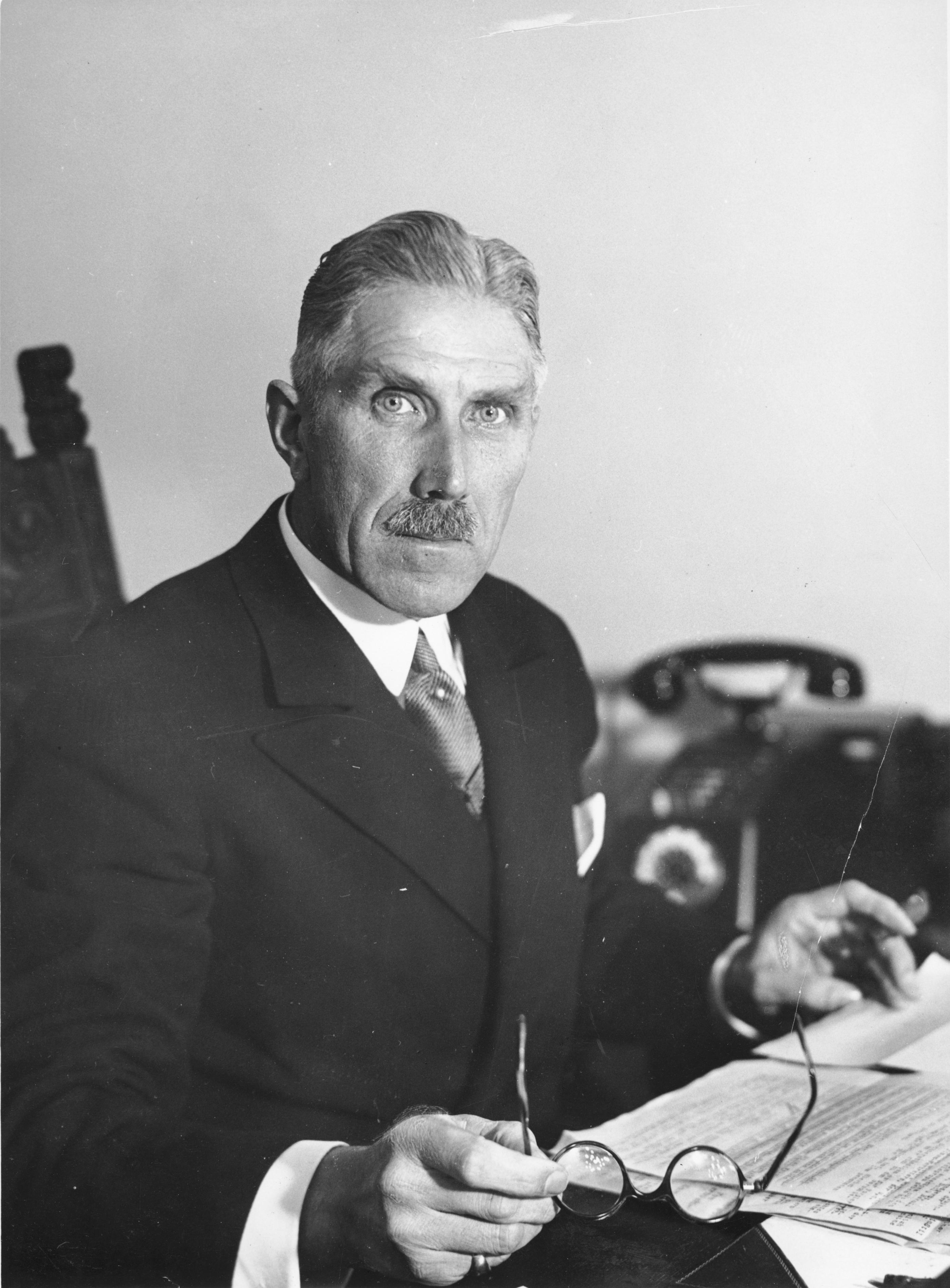
Pictured: Franz von Papen

Safehaven negotiations with Turkey were distinct from all other neutral country negotiations with the Allies as Turkey had been neutral up until February 1945 when they joined the Allied forces for the remainder of the war. Despite an allegiance with the Allies, the US did not see this as a factor to exempt Turkey from Safehaven accords. The United States believed that Turkey was used as an epicentre for reconnaissance during the war and that the German ambassador to Turkey, Franz von Papen was hiding assets in Turkey to reduce his economic penalties at the Nuremberg Trials of 1945/1946. As a result, the United States sent notes to Turkey on November 4, 1944 warning that it should not acquire or store additional German gold. The Turkish government did not respond to this note until March 1945 and failed to implement any measures to control German assets in Turkey.

The Safehaven accord with Turkey was only decided on December 30, 1947. It stipulated that Turkey must agree to the January 1943 Declaration, the Gold Declaration of 1944 and the Bretton Woods Resolution VI. It also declared that Turkey would deliver to the Allies all monetary gold proven to have been looted from German victims, however only once Turkish claims against Germany had been satisfied. The Allies were under the impression that the Turkish ratification of the Safehaven agreement was only awaiting the passing of a bill in their National Assembly granting them authority to negotiate and approve the agreement. However, on March 25, 1950 when the Turkish National Assembly adjourned without passing the Safehaven agreement, the Allies, frustrated at a lack of progress, abandoned the Allied-Turkish Safehaven Accord and began exploring other negotiation avenues to achieve their diplomatic goals.

=== Ireland ===
In October 1944 the United States sent notes to Ireland declaring an intention to confiscate German assets from the neutral countries after the war was won and asked for cooperation in these efforts. Ireland was requested to catalogue all German assets and property within its borders.

Ireland's geographical isolation from Europe largely restricted German capacities to hide assets in Ireland during the war. This resulted in Ireland possessing the smallest number of German assets out of the neutral nations. Safehaven initiatives in Ireland were as a result not driven by the Allies’ need to secure assets but rather acted as a vehicle by which Ireland could be punished for its neutrality during the war.

Consistent with the views of Spain, Ireland was initially reluctant to participate in the Safehaven program due to fears of compromising its neutrality and sovereignty. After a three-year diplomatic battle with the United States Ireland sent a note in August 1948 to the Allies detailing German capital assets remaining in Ireland and offering cooperation with the Safehaven program.

== Project Safehaven after the war ==
After the second world war ended, the responsibility of restoring assets recovered during the war by the Allies in Germany and other neutral nations was carried out. This was a complex task as looted gold and other assets were difficult to trace.

== Limitations of the Operation ==
Project Safehaven was plagued with weaknesses from its conception. The directives given to the FEA, State and Treasury departments in 1944 regarding the aims, objectives, procedures, scope and depth of Project Safehaven were exceptionally broad, vague and unclear. This resulted in large quantities of intelligence all being equated to have the same worth and usefulness and subsequently all pieces of intelligence were investigated into lightly and quickly, rather than deciphering the most useful intelligence and conducting an in-depth investigation into a lead.

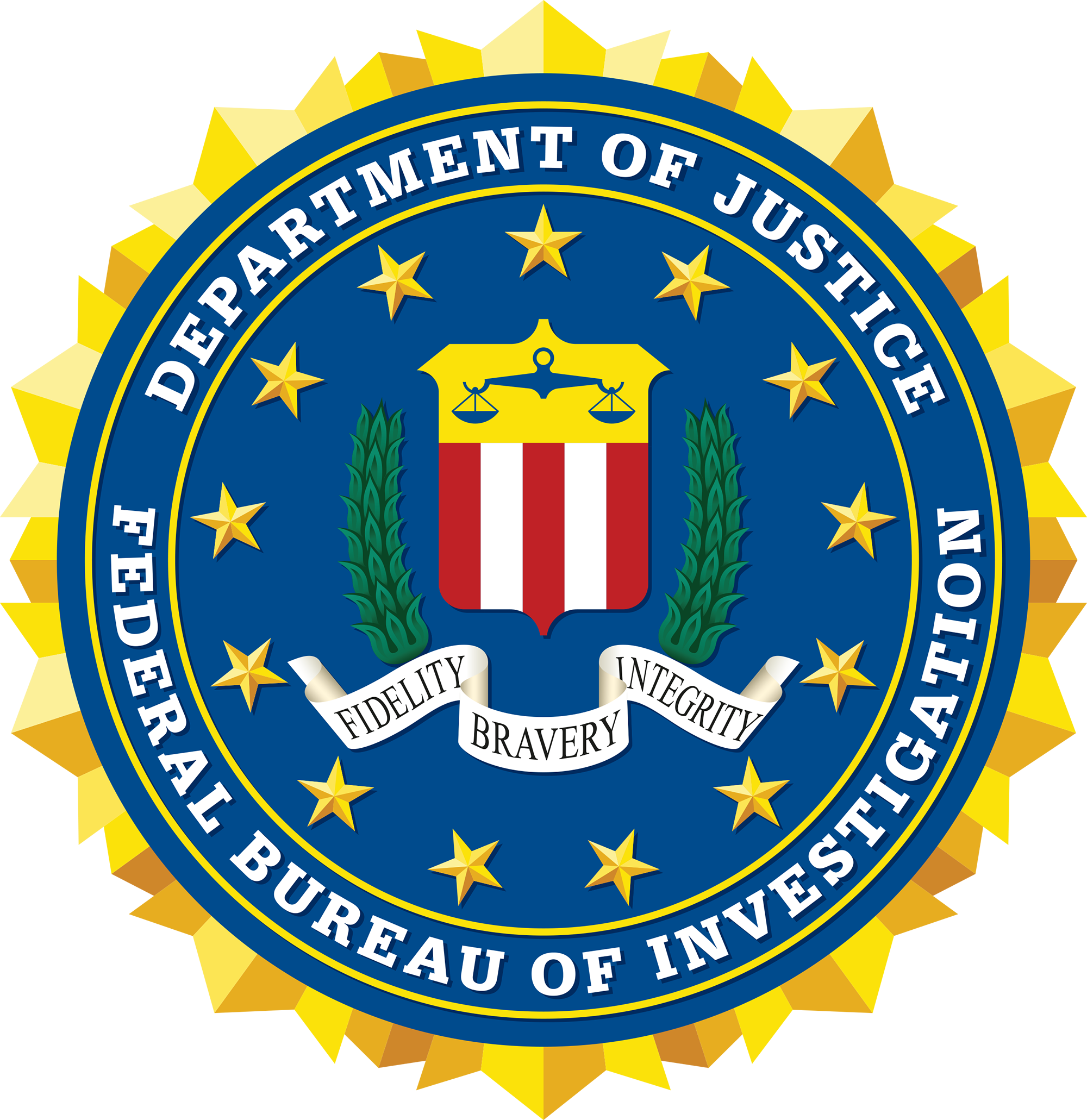
Logo of the FBI: one of the many agencies involved in Project Safehaven

The size and scope of Project Safehaven was another contributing factor to its lack of success. By July 1944, more than 12 taskforces across 8 different agencies were involved in the operation. This included 5 FEA branches; the Office of Economic Programs, General Council Office, Special Areas Branch, Branch Blockade Division and Economic Intelligence Division. It also included the Department of State, the Department of War, The Department of Treasury, the Office of Censorship, the Office of Strategic Services, the FBI and the Office of Naval Intelligence. The operation as a result produced hundreds of files and intelligence inquires, an excessive amount of information that spanned across 6 continents. Effective communication and collaboration across this extensive network of agencies was virtually impossible and resulted in major inefficiencies.

Major discourse that existed between the FEA, the State Department and the Department of Treasury also diminished Operation Safehaven's capacity for success. The FEA and the Department of Treasury sought a punitive peace; an approach that intended to punish and weaken Germany as a consequence for their actions during the war while the State Department wanted to keep Germany powerful but pacified. These conflicting attitudes created a power struggle in the US government as each agency fought for control of the operation. These politics sabotaged the operation from within by restricting efficiency and directing the focus of the department officials away from Safehaven's objectives.

== Outcomes ==
By 1948 little progress had been made and the intelligence produced by Operation Safehaven proved to not be very useful or of importance to the Allies. In 1948, Cold War fears and uncertainty outweighed the fears of a fourth Reich resurgence and subsequently the need for Project Safehaven diminished and eventually saw its termination due to the fact that the United States and Allied forces placed their priorities on foreign affairs other than Safehaven.

While no new investigations in Project Safehaven were undertaken post 1948, it took the Allies years to collect and implement the accords established under the operation. The Allied-Swiss Safehaven accord proved highly complex and took over 10 years to interpret and resolve the disputes and questions arising from the agreement. There were also extensive delays in the allies physically receiving all the assets. The last of the Safehaven agreements were not received until July 1959 when the Allies received the outstanding $65 million pesetas from Spain, representing the end of Spanish payments.

== See also ==
- Nazi gold
- Nazi plunder
- Roberts Commissions
- Ratlines
- Secret Nazi meeting in Strasbourg 1944
