= Nazi secret meeting in Strasbourg 1944 =

A Nazi secret meeting in Strasbourg took place on August 10, 1944, just a few months before the end of World War II, at the Hôtel de la Maison Rouge in Strasbourg as a clandestine gathering of high-ranking Nazi and business leaders. According to American intelligence reports, SS leaders and representatives of major industry discussed strategies for preserving and financing German industrial capacity following a defeat. According to the SHAEF Intelligence Report EW-Pa 128, the focus was on “underground activities following Germany’s defeat” and the transfer of capital to neutral countries. In popular literature and the press ( “Red House Report”), the meeting was sometimes interpreted as the beginning of the alleged establishment of a hidden “Fourth Reich”.

== Background ==
By late summer 1944, Germany’s defeat in World War II was becoming apparent. Following the Allies’ successful landing in Normandy, the retreat from France began. The Stauffenberg plot to assassinate Hitler on July 20, 1944, failed. The Nazi leadership increasingly relied on intelligence operations to save Reich gold and foreign currency reserves from the victorious powers. Heinrich Himmler apparently wanted to make preparations in case of defeat: as late as January 1945, he instructed Gauleiters to prepare potential Nazi officials for assignments abroad. Allied intelligence agencies had already begun gathering information on meetings between Nazis and industry representatives who were discussing plans for a postwar Nazi underground. The report on the Strasbourg meeting was therefore included in the “Safehaven” dossier and forwarded to the US State Department in November 1944. The Allies apparently learned of the meeting thanks to a statement from a French informant with good contacts in German industry, who was deemed credible by U.S. intelligence circles.

== Alleged participants ==
Various sources have identified the following groups and individuals:

- Nazi leaders: An SS Obergruppenführer (referred to as “Dr. Scheid” in the reports) apparently presided over the meeting. The East German propagandist and writer Julius Mader named Reichsbank President Hjalmar Schacht, Ernst Kaltenbrunner, and Abwehr chief Wilhelm Canaris as additional participants (though this is generally considered implausible). Reichsführer-SS Heinrich Himmler and I.G. Farben employee Max Faust were named as the actual forces behind the meeting and the plans to transfer Nazi assets.
- Large industrial companies: Representatives of major defense and industrial conglomerates were in attendance. Notable among them were Krupp, Messerschmitt, Röchling, and Rheinmetall. Managers from other well-known companies were also in attendance—including Volkswagen, Brown Boveri, Zeiss, and Leica. An earlier account mistakenly listed Emil Kirdorf, Fritz Thyssen, and Gustav Krupp as participants; however, Kirdorf had died in 1938 and Thyssen was in prison in 1944.
- Officials from the Wehrmacht and Nazi ministries: The sources also mention officers or officials from the Navy and the Reich Ministry of Armaments and War Production. In some cases, there is mention of meetings of smaller expert groups (e.g., led by a Dr. Bosse from the Ministry of Armaments) in which capital flight and the continuation of Nazi networks were discussed.

== Meeting ==
According to the intelligence report, the meeting took place on August 10, 1944, at the Hôtel de la Maison Rouge (the “Red House”) in Strasbourg. According to statements by French informants, the final status report on German industry was drawn up here and a secret plan was agreed upon. This plan involved the immediate evacuation of equipment from France, the acknowledgment of military defeat, and the preparation of underground activities to remain capable of action despite Germany’s coming surrender. The report states that according to Dr. Scheid’s statements, German industry must “realize that the war can no longer be won” and must immediately establish contacts and alliances with foreign companies, as well as lay the financial groundwork for the postwar period. Allegedly, during a second meeting, the SS leadership and ministry representatives instructed the inner circle of industrialists to support a future illegal Nazi underground organization via banks in Switzerland by depositing assets in neutral countries and financing the NSDAP’s postwar plans.

== Fallout ==
In the short term, the meeting had no further practical impact on the course of the war—Germany surrendered a few months later. The Allies, however, used the report as part of their “safe haven” investigations to prevent the flight of German assets. In postwar debates and the media, the Strasbourg meeting was long portrayed as evidence of a planned “Fourth Reich” (for example, Elan Steinberg of the World Jewish Congress cited the report in 1996 to speak of an extensive Nazi network), and Simon Wiesenthal had already put forward similar theories as early as the 1960s. The report also contributed to the spread of myths about Nazi gold supposedly scattered across the globe. Historians point out, however, that while real discussions did take place, they were mostly focused on practical matters such as saving companies, capital, and patents, as well as hiding Nazi officials. Myths surrounding a global Nazi conspiracy (such as “Project Odessa”) were generally dismissed as urban legends. There is evidence that Switzerland was indeed used for large-scale capital flight from Germany and that much of the money was never recovered.

== See also ==
- Freundeskreis Reichsführer SS
