= Ministries Trial =

Trial

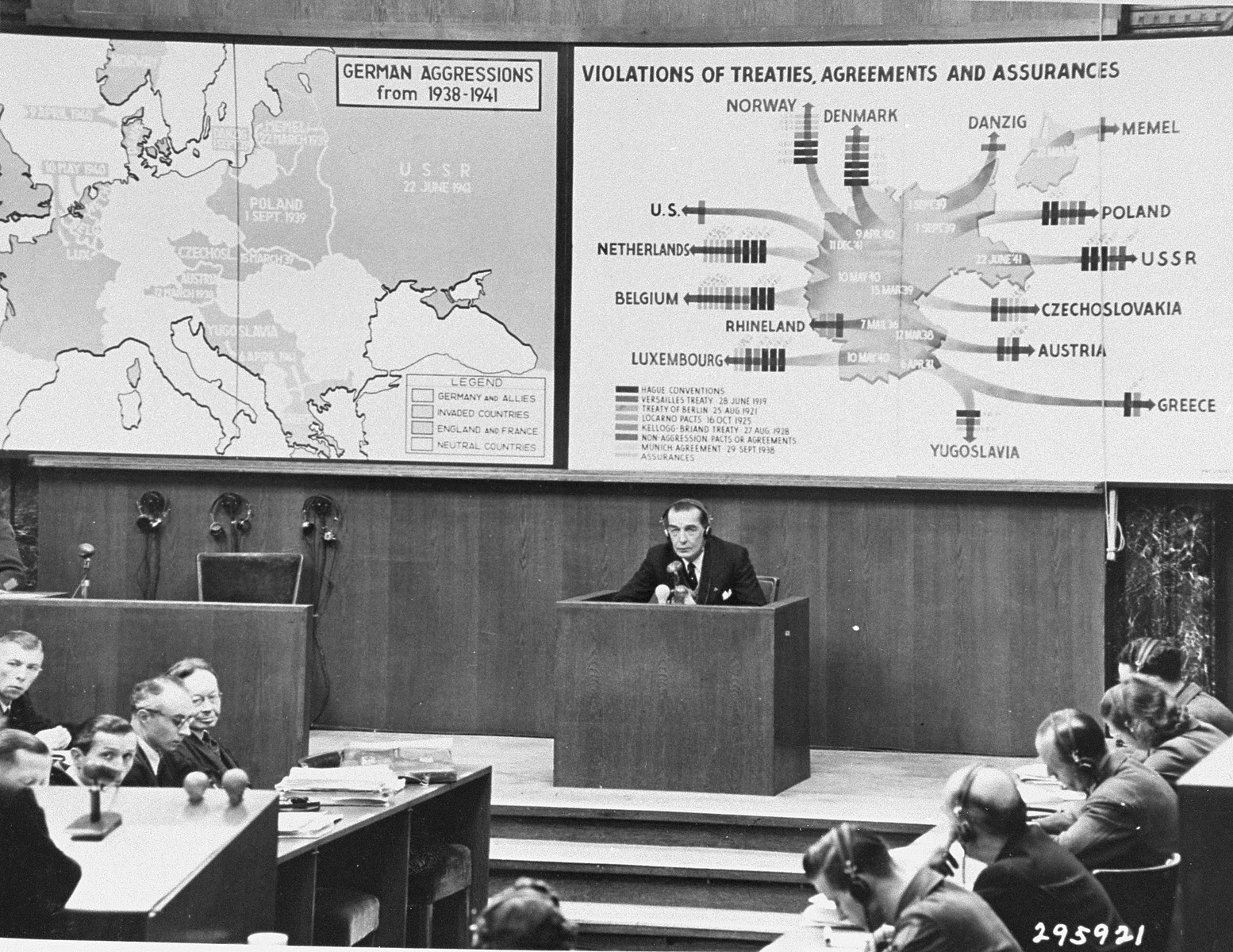
Theodor von Hornbostel testifies for the prosecution during the Ministries Trial

The Ministries Trial (or, officially, the United States of America vs. Ernst von Weizsäcker, et al.) was the eleventh of the twelve trials for war crimes the U.S. authorities held in their occupation zone in Germany in Nuremberg after the end of World War II. These twelve trials were all held before U.S. military courts, not before the International Military Tribunal, but took place in the same rooms at the Palace of Justice. The twelve U.S. trials are collectively known as the "subsequent Nuremberg trials" or, more formally, as the "Trials of War Criminals before the Nuremberg Military Tribunals" (NMT).

This case is also known as the Wilhelmstrasse Trial, so-named because both the Reich Chancellery and the German Foreign Office were located at the Wilhelmstrasse, a street in Berlin that was often used as a metonym for overall German governmental administration. The defendants in this case were officials of various Reich ministries, facing various charges for their roles in Nazi Germany and thus their participation in or responsibility for the numerous atrocities committed both in Germany and in occupied countries during the war.

The judges in this case, heard before Military Tribunal VI, were William C. Christianson (presiding judge) from Minnesota, Robert F. Maguire from Oregon and Leon W. Powers from Iowa. The Chief of Counsel for the Prosecution was Telford Taylor; the chief prosecutor was Robert Kempner. The indictment was filed on 15 November 1947; the hearings lasted from 6 January 1948 until 18 November that year. Five months later, on 11 April 1949, the judges presented their 833-page judgment. Sentences were handed down on 13 April 1949. Of all the twelve trials, this was the one that lasted longest and ended last. Of the 21 defendants arraigned, two were acquitted, and 18 others were found guilty on at least one count of their indictments and received prison sentences ranging from three years to 25 years. In addition, one defendant, Ernst Wilhelm Bohle, pleaded guilty, becoming the only defendant to do so in the subsequent Nuremberg trials.

== Indictment ==
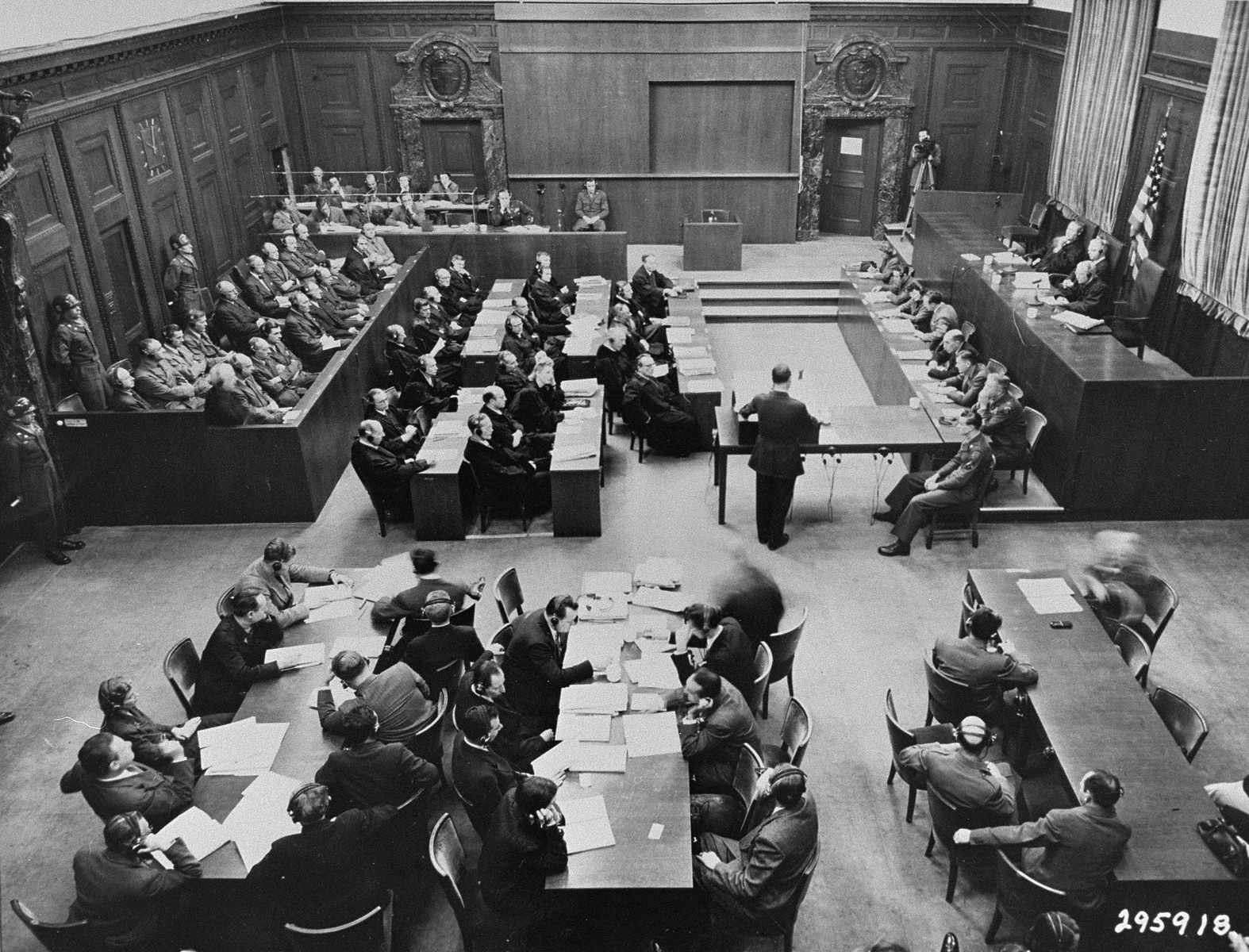
Telford Taylor delivers the prosecution's opening statement.

The defendants were all indicted on at least one of seven counts:

Count 1: Crime against peace

Count 2: Taking part in a common plan or conspiracy to commit the aforementioned crimes (later dropped by the NMT in all trials)

Count 3: War crimes against prisoners of war

Count 4: Crimes against humanity through atrocities against German nationals on political, racial, and religious grounds between 1933 and 1939 (count dropped)

Count 5: War crimes and crimes against humanity through atrocities against civilian population

Count 6: War crimes and crimes against humanity through the plundering and spoliation of the occupied territories

Count 7: War crimes and crimes against humanity through the enslavement and deportation of concentration camp prisoners and civilians in the occupied countries for slave labor

Count 8: Membership in a criminal organization, the NSDAP and the SS

== Defendants ==
| Name | Photo | Function | Verdict and sentence |
|---|---|---|---|
| Ernst von Weizsäcker | | Permanent Secretary of State in the Auswärtiges Amt (Foreign Ministry) under Ribbentrop until 1943, then ambassador to the Holy See; SS-Brigadeführer. | 7 years for counts 1 and 5; count 1 overturned and reduced to 5 years on 12 December 1949; commuted to time served and released in October 1950; died in 1951 |
| Gustav Adolf Steengracht von Moyland | | Successor of von Weizsäcker as Secretary of State in the Foreign Ministry (until 1945). | 7 years for counts 3 and 5; count 3 overturned and reduced to 5 years on 12 December 1949; released in January 1950; died in 1969 |
| Wilhelm Keppler | | Secretary of State; Hitler's advisor for economy. | 10 years for counts 1, 5, 6, and 8; commuted to time served and released in February 1951 |
| Ernst Wilhelm Bohle | | NS-Gauleiter, Secretary of State in the Foreign Ministry; head of the Auslandorganisation (foreign organization) of the NSDAP. | 5 years for count 8; released in December 1949; died in 1960 |
| Ernst Woermann | | Secretary in the Foreign Ministry; head of the political division. German Ambassador to China, Wang Jingwei regime. | 7 years for counts 1 and 5; count 1 overturned and reduced to 5 years on 12 December 1949; released in January 1950; died in 1979 |
| Karl Ritter | | Liaison between Foreign Office and the High Command of the German armed forces. | 4 years for count 3; released after the judgment; died in 1968 |
| Otto von Erdmannsdorff | | Secretary in the Foreign Ministry; deputy to Woermann. | Acquitted; died in 1978 |
| Edmund Veesenmayer | | Plenipotentiary in Hungary. | 20 years for counts 5, 7, and 8; commuted to 10 years in January 1951; released in December 1951; died in 1977 |
| Hans Heinrich Lammers | | Head of the Reich Chancellery. Indicted on all counts. | 20 years for counts 1, 3, 5, 7, and 8; commuted to 10 years in January 1951; released in December 1951; died in 1962 |
| Wilhelm Stuckart | | Secretary of State in the Interior Ministry. | Time served (3 years and 10 months) for counts 5, 6, and 8. Died in a car crash in 1953.^{1} |
| Richard Walther Darré | | Minister for Food and Agriculture. | 7 years for counts 5, 6, and 8; released in August 1950; died in 1953 |
| Otto Meissner | | Head of the Presidential Chancellery. | Acquitted; died in 1953 |
| Otto Dietrich | | Reich Press Chief of the NSDAP and Secretary of State in the Propagandaministerium. | 7 years for counts 5 and 8; released in 1950; died in 1952 |
| Gottlob Berger | | Head of the SS Main Office, SS-Obergruppenführer. | 25 years imprisonment for counts 3, 5, 7, and 8; commuted to 10 years in January 1951; released in December 1951 |
| Walter Schellenberg | | Second-in-command of the Gestapo, head of the SD and the Abwehr, and successor of Wilhelm Canaris as the head of the Combined Secret Services; SS-Brigadeführer. | 6 years for counts 5 and 8; released in December 1950; died in 1952 |
| Lutz Graf Schwerin von Krosigk | | Minister of Finance, de facto Chancellor of Germany, officially titled "Leading Minister", in May 1945 after the death of Joseph Goebbels. | 10 years for counts 5 and 6; commuted to time served and released in February 1951 |
| Emil Puhl | | Vice-president of the Reichsbank. | 5 years for count 5; released in December 1949; died in 1962 |
| Paul Körner | | Secretary of State and deputy to Göring in the Four Year Plan; SS-Obergruppenführer. | 15 years for counts 1, 6, 7, and 8; commuted to 10 years in January 1951; released in December 1951; died in 1957 |
| Paul Pleiger | | Head of the Reichswerke Hermann Göring (confiscated steel plants employing slave laborers). | 15 years for counts 6 and 7; commuted to 10 years in January 1951; released in December 1951 |
| Hans Kehrl | | Secretary in the Ministry of Armament; head of the planning office. | 15 years for counts 5-8; commuted to time served and released in February 1951 |
| Karl Rasche | | Director of the Dresdner Bank. | 7 years for counts 6 and 8; released in August 1950; died in 1951 |

^1 Stuckart was tried again in 1950 before a denazification court and sentenced as a Mitläufer (follower) a fine of DM 50,000.

Herbert Backe, the former minister for agriculture who should also have been tried, committed suicide on 6 April 1947 while in custody awaiting the trial.
