= Paul Pleiger =

German industrialist and war criminal (1899–1985)

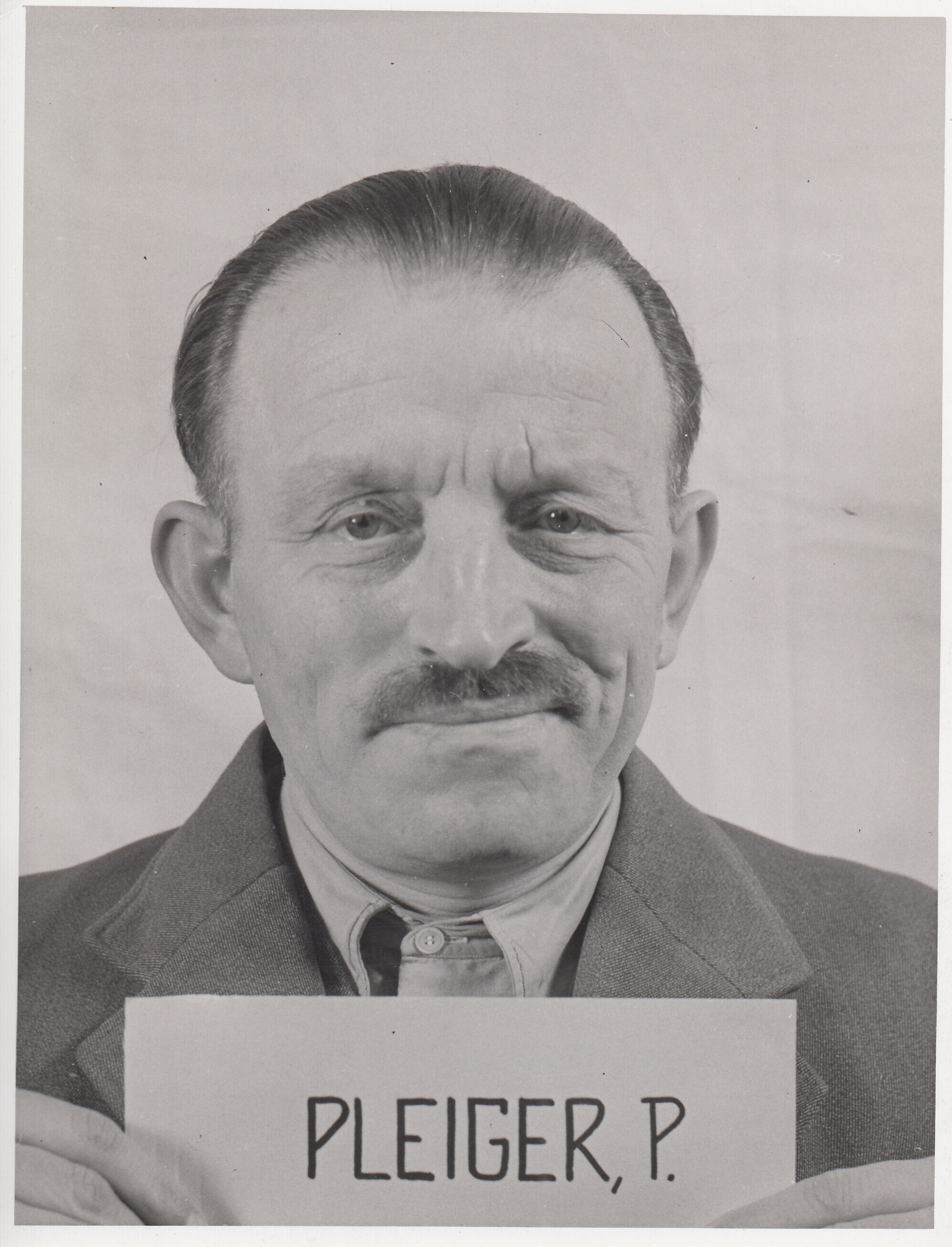
- Pleiger in Nuremberg, c. 1946–1949

Supervisory Board Chairman Reichswerke Hermann Göring
- In office 1 May 1942 – 8 May 1945
- Preceded by: Paul Körner
- Succeeded by: Position abolished

Reich Commissioner for Coal Supply
- In office 24 March 1941 – 8 May 1945
- Preceded by: Position created
- Succeeded by: Position abolished

Chairman, Reich Coal Association
- In office 24 March 1941 – 8 May 1945
- Preceded by: Position created
- Succeeded by: Position abolished

Personal details
- Born: 28 September 1899 Buchholz-Kämpen, Province of Westphalia, Kingdom of Prussia, German Empire
- Died: 22 July 1985 (aged 85) Witten, North Rhine-Westphalia, West Germany
- Awards: Knight's Cross of the War Merit Cross with Swords; Golden Party Badge

Paul Pleiger (28 September 1899 – 22 July 1985) was a German entrepreneur and corporate executive who was involved in managing the war economy of Nazi Germany. He was the managing director of the Reichswerke Hermann Göring from 1937 and became chairman of its supervisory board in 1942. From 1941, he served as the Reich Delegate for Coal Supply and the chairman of the Reich Coal Association. He was convicted of war crimes and crimes against humanity by the Nuremberg Military Tribunal and sentenced to fifteen years imprisonment.

== Early life and career ==
Pleiger, the son of a miner, was apprenticed as a locksmith and lathe operator between 1913 and 1917 and then attended an engineering technical school in Elberfeld. He then worked as an engineer at the Harpen Mining Company in Dortmund. In January 1925 he founded his own company in Sprockhövel, Paul Pleiger Maschinenfabrik, a factory that manufactured machinery and equipment for mining. In March 1932 he joined the Nazi Party and became the Ortsgruppenleiter (Local Group Leader) in Sprockhövel. He later would be awarded the Golden Party Badge. In 1933, he was admitted to the Party's paramilitary wing, theSturmabteilung (SA), with the rank of SA-Sturmfuhrer, and also became the Gau economic advisor in Gau Westphalia-South, headed by Gauleiter Josef Wagner.

== Career in Nazi Germany ==
In November 1934, at the request of Wilhelm Keppler, Hitler's advisor for economic affairs, Pleiger went to work for him in Berlin, dealing with the promotion of ore mining. In October 1936, when the Four Year Plan was established under Hermann Göring, Pleiger headed its iron department in the office for raw materials. In July 1937, Göring made Pleiger the general director of the newly founded Reichswerke Hermann Göring, an ore mining and ironworks conglomerate. Under his leadership, it grew to be the largest such concern in Europe, expanding with the Anschluss with Austria and the takeover of Czechoslovakia and Poland. By 1940, it employed over 600,000 workers. Pleiger served on the Vorstand (management board) from 1939, becoming chairman in 1941. In May 1942, he succeeded Paul Körner as chairman of the Aufsichtsrat (supervisory board) and served until the fall of the Nazi regime in May 1945. In January 1938 he was named a Wehrwirtschaftsführer (War Economy Leader). After the conquest of France and Luxembourg, Pleiger was made Treuhänder (Trustee) for the iron ore regions of Lorraine and Luxembourg. He also sat on Albert Speer's Armaments Council from 1941.

As general director of the Reichswerke Hermann Göring, Pleiger was one of the most influential economic functionaries and state entrepreneurs of Nazi Germany, also holding supervisory and executive board positions in numerous other corporations. He was the manager from August 1941 to 1943 and, from 1943 until 1945, the chairman of the management board of the Berg- und Hüttenwerksgesellschaft Ost (Mining and Metallurgical Company East). Following the attack on the Soviet Union, he was given responsibility for the coal and steel sector in the Wirtschaftsorganisation Ost (Economic Organization East) and was named Reich Representative for the Entire Economy of the East. On 25 March 1941, Pleiger became chairman of the new Reichsvereinigung Kohl (Reich Coal Association), consisting of representatives of fourteen coal producers, distributors and consumers. He was simultaneously named Reichsbeauftragter für die Kohlenversorgung (Reich Commissioner for Coal Supply), including for the occupied territories.

In 1943, Göring, in his capacity as Prussian Minister president, named Pleiger to the Prussian State Council. On 10 May 1943, Pleiger received the Knight's Cross of the War Merit Cross with Swords. Long a loyal protégé of Göring, on the occasion of the Reichsmarschall's fiftieth birthday in January 1943, Pleiger presented him with a gift of one million Reichsmarks, one hundred thousand from the Reichswerke Hermann Göring and the remainder from a fund controlled by the Reich Coal Association.

== Postwar trial and subsequent life ==
In his numerous industrial management capacities, Pleiger bore responsibility for human and material exploitation of the occupied territories with all its associated coercive and repressive measures. In the Ministries Trial, the last of the trials conducted by the International Military Tribunal in Nuremberg, he was indicted for crimes against peace, wartime looting and utilization of forced labor. His defense team included Robert Servatius, who had previously defended Fritz Sauckel in the Nuremberg trials and Karl Brandt in the Doctors' Trial, and who also would go on to defend Adolf Eichmann. Found guilty on the second and third counts, he was sentenced on 13 April 1949 to 15 years imprisonment. However, he was granted early release in March 1951 from Landsberg Prison and returned to the board of directors of his company in Sprockhövel, the Pleiger Gruppe. He devoted himself to rebuilding his company, which had been under trusteeship after the war. After his retirement, operations continued under the direction of his son, Dr. Paul Pleiger, Jr. until his death in an automobile accident in 1983. Pleiger died two years later, on 22 July 1985 in Hattingen. His company is still in business today and has expanded to China, South Korea and the United States.

== See also ==
- Ministries Trial

== Sources ==
- Irving, David (1990). Göring: A Biography. New York: William Morrow & Co. ISBN 978-0-380-70824-6.
- Klee, Ernst (2007). Das Personenlexikon zum Dritten Reich. Wer war was vor und nach 1945. Frankfurt-am-Main: Fischer-Taschenbuch-Verlag. ISBN 978-3-596-16048-8.
- Paul Pleiger entry in the Deutsche Biographie
- Zentner, Christian; Bedürftig, Friedemann, eds. (1997) [1991]. The Encyclopedia of the Third Reich. New York: Da Capo Press. ISBN 978-0-306-80793-0.
