= Reichswerke Hermann Göring =

Nazi-controlled industrial conglomerate in WWII

- Industry: Conglomerate
- Predecessor: Phönix-AG für Braunkohlenverwertung
- Founded: 1937
- Founders: Hermann Göring
- Defunct: 1945
- Fate: Captured and nationalized by Allied soldiers, 1943–1945
- Successor: Salzgitter AG
- Headquarters: Berlin, Nazi Germany
- Area served: Nazi Germany and annexed territories
- Number of employees: Around 500,000

Reichswerke Hermann Göring ("Hermann Göring Reich Works") was an industrial conglomerate in Nazi Germany from 1937 until 1945. It was established to extract and process domestic iron ores from Salzgitter that were deemed uneconomical by the privately held steel mills. The state-owned Reichswerke was seen as a vehicle for hastening growth in ore mining and steel output regardless of private capitalists' plans and opinions, which ran in alignment to Adolf Hitler's strategic and economic vision. In November 1937, Reichsminister of Aviation Hermann Göring obtained unchecked access to state financing and launched a chain of mergers, diversifying into military industries with the absorption of Rheinmetall. Göring himself supervised the Reichswerke but did not own it in any sense and did not make personal profit from it directly, although at times he withdrew cash for personal expenses.

After the Anschluss, the Reichswerke absorbed Austrian heavy industries, including those owned by private German investors. The cluster of steel mills and supporting companies in Linz became its most important asset. Nazi leadership regarded captured assets as the property of the state and were not willing to share the spoils with German businesses. After the German occupation of Czechoslovakia, the Reichswerke absorbed between 50 and 60 per cent of Czech heavy industries. The pattern was repeated in occupied Poland, France and the Soviet Union. The Reichswerke operated captured assets as far from its base as Liepāja in Latvia and Donetsk in eastern Ukraine. It provided one-eighth of German steel output during the Second World War and created a Nazi-controlled military complex that was independent of private interests. By the end of 1941 the Reichswerke became the largest company in Europe and probably in the whole world, with a capital of 2.4 billion ℛ︁ℳ︁ and about half a million workers.

In 1942 the Reichswerke's inefficient corporate structure was reduced in size. Its weapons and munitions assets were integrated into the Ministry of Armaments; the mining and steel core of the Reichswerke continued operation under Göring's supervision until the end of the war, albeit at a loss. The conglomerate was dismembered by the Allies in 1944–1945, but the Salzgitter plant continued operations as Reichswerke until 1953. The Reichswerke logo, which resembled Göring's coat of arms, remained in use by Peine+Salzgitter until the middle of the 1980s.

== Salzgitter ==
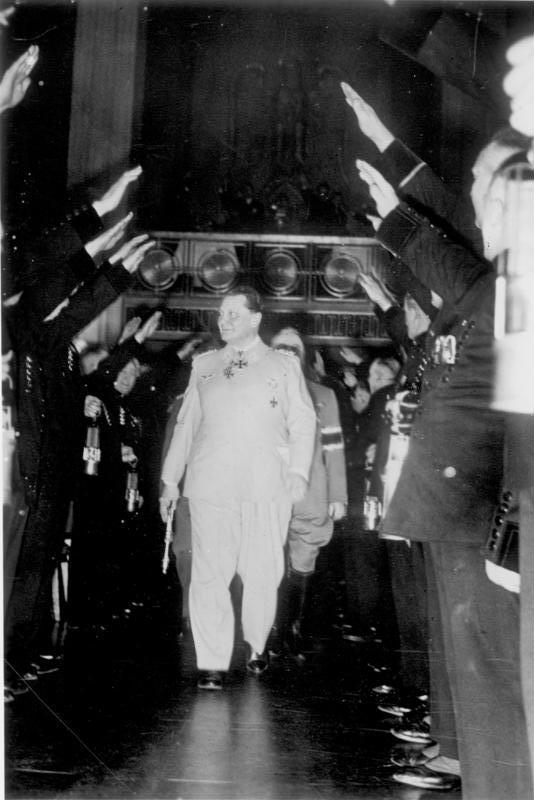
1941. Göring at an assembly of mining personnel in Berlin. According to the archive caption, only 57 of 625 men belonged to the Reichswerke.

In 1935–1936 German steel industry, concentrated in the Ruhr area, recovered from the Great Depression and reached nearly full utilization of its mills. It was dominated by privately held Vereinigte Stahlwerke (VS), Krupp, Gutehoffnungshütte and Mannesmann. Three quarters of iron ore processed in Germany was imported; domestic ore reserves in the Salzgitter area were deemed to be of too poor quality to be economical. Demand for iron and steel rose in line with the rise in military spending, further increasing dependence on imports. Influential people inside the Nazi Party, including Hitler's economic advisor Wilhelm Keppler, rallied to increase domestic iron ore mining.

Iron ore became the principal problem of the Four Year Plan (1936–1940). In October 1936 Göring learned that Stewarts & Lloyds foundry in Corby, United Kingdom, had successfully smelted low-grade ores; the new technology removed the barriers for Göring's plans. In December 1936 Göring announced that domestic ore, iron and steel program had become a national priority and that he would not tolerate hesitation or obstruction by private owners of the resources. Private capital raised their objections against rapid growth, and Göring settled to take ore mining under state control.

Throughout the first half of 1937 Göring rallied for a self-sufficient steel industry, and against the steel barons. His radical calls improved his own political weight and silenced the opposition. Göring's aim of bringing the economy in line with Adolf Hitler's strategic plans was fully supported by the Nazi press. The danger of relying on ore imports was proven by the strikes and anti-Nazi sentiment in Sweden and by the success of the Popular Front in France. In July 1937 the steel barons were stunned by a decree which instituted the Reichswerke, an integrated state company tasked with surpassing the Ruhr in finished steel output. Fearing creation of excessive industrial capacity and cutthroat competition with the state, they cautiously discussed the ways of curbing Göring's ambitions. They joined arms with Göring's adversary, Reichsminister of Economics Hjalmar Schacht, who denied state financing to Göring's project.

On 23 July 1937 Göring announced that the Reichswerke would begin mining and processing Salzgitter ores and that the government would take over privately held ore deposits in exchange for minority shares in the new enterprises. Paul Pleiger became the managing director. Critics argued that the Salzgitter project would consume more steel than it could produce in three years. The Ruhr attempted a coordinated response, but wire-tapping and surveillance gave Göring advance knowledge of the steel barons' moves and he preempted their organized action through personal threats and promises. The steel barons escaped an open confrontation with the regime but the trust between Nazi leadership and big business was lost forever. Schacht was compelled to resign in November 1937, his function passed to Göring.

== Workforce ==
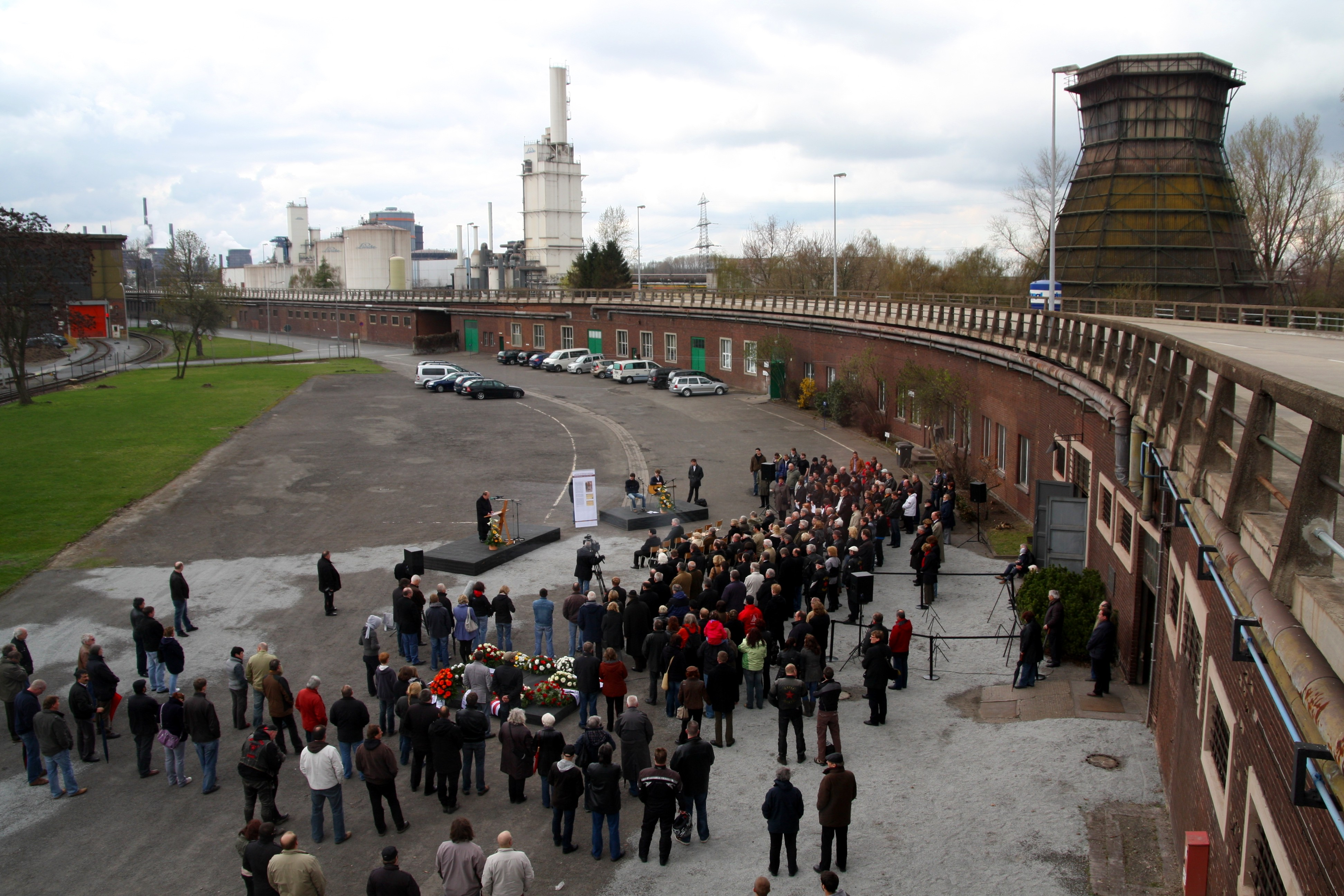
Drütte concentration camp memorial at Salzgitter

The Salzgitter project recruited its workforce from all over Germany, Austria, Italy, the Netherlands and other countries. It produced its first pig iron in October 1939 and its first steel in August 1940. A large metalworking plant, Stahlwerke Braunschweig, was built nearby, starting in March 1940; eventually it became one of the largest plants in the country, employing ten thousand workers. The majority of Salzgitter area staff, 47,000 workers, were non-Germans. In five years, 1937 to 1942, population increased fivefold. Housing was not sufficient even for native Germans; foreign workers had to live in seventy makeshift camps.

The Gestapo ran an on-site concentration camp for workers deemed to be "delinquent". Slave labor of prisoners from Nazi concentration camps was employed from May 1944. The three camps that supplied slaves to Salzgitter contained up to 6,500 prisoners. Another local camp, Drutte, supplied slave workers for the Reichswerke's ammunition plants from 1942 (see List of subcamps of Neuengamme, Celler Hasenjagd). Salzgitter was the target of Allied bombings several times but damage to the plant was insignificant. Its blast furnaces operated until captured by the Americans in April 1945.

== Expansion ==
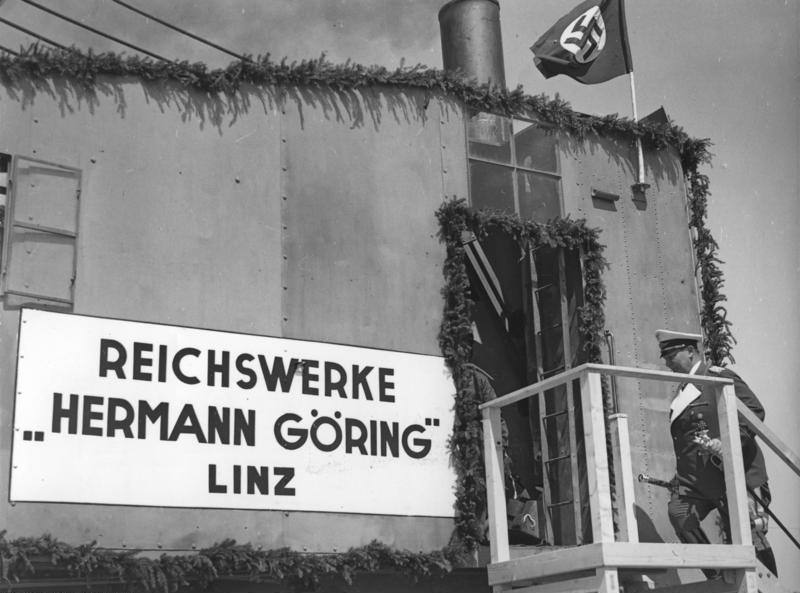
13 May 1938. Hermann Göring visits construction site of the Reichswerke in Linz.

After the removal of Schacht in November 1937, the Reichswerke rapidly grew while privately held steel mills of the Ruhr were deprived of capital (their capacity remained at 16 million tons p.a. until the outbreak of the Second World War). In February 1938 Göring pumped up the Reichswerke capital from 5 to 400 million ℛ︁ℳ︁, starting a chain of mergers. In April the Reichswerke moved into weapons production by absorbing Rheinmetall. In a few following months the Reichswerke consolidated most of Austrian heavy industries, from extraction of ore to production of advanced weapons.

Göring turned his eyes to Austrian steel in 1937. The Anschluss of March 1938 gave him practically unlimited access to Austrian resources. The Reichswerke's activities in Austria demonstrated that Göring regarded captured assets as state property and was not willing to share the fortunes with private German businesses – on the contrary, the Reichswerke absorbed Austrian assets that were already owned by German investors and eliminated the barons of Ruhr from Austrian industry. Its primary target in Austria, Alpine Montangesellschaft steel company, was 56% owned by German giant VS. Immediately after the Anschluss, Göring advised VS to speed up mining its Austrian ores, and again the private business refused for fear of overproduction. The Reichswerke purchased a non-controlling share in Alpine and then wrestled complete control over the company for six months. Regulatory pressure threatened to devalue Alpine, and in March 1939 VS stepped aside. Alpine's ore resources were vital for Göring's second great project – the new vertically integrated cluster of steel mills in Linz which also included Eisenwerke Oberdonau and numerous construction and shipping companies. Göring, in his functions of President of Prussia and Chief of the Luftwaffe, also established close ties between the Reichswerke and the oil and aircraft industries.

Relationships between the state and steel barons continued to deteriorate, and Göring used the same pattern of intimidation to extort other Austrian and later Czech assets from their past owners. The Reichswerke absorbed 50 to 60 per cent of Czech heavy industry, and a slightly lesser share in Austria. Takeover mechanisms ranged from bona fide stock purchase to control by proxy through dependent local banks to outright confiscation, as was the case of the British-owned Rothschild family mill in Vitkovice. Sudetenland, annexed in 1938, brought the first substantial coal reserves. In Germany, the Reichswerke effectively subdued the Ruhr barons by forcing them to supply coal to Salzgitter blast furnaces, commissioned in 1939, at below-market price. "Acquisition" of Polish coal mines allowed the Reichswerke to drop coal prices even lower.

After the outbreak of the war, the Reichswerke abandoned peacetime formalities and simply took over all "German" assets it found attractive. It declared itself "a trustee for the German state" for the duration of the war, a white knight saving occupied countries from "colonialism" of big business. Settlements and compensations, when recognized, were delayed until the end of the war. But the Reichswerke's own post-war plans, developed in 1942, called for a further increase of state control over heavy industries and industrialization of the eastern territories at the expense of the Ruhr. The Reichswerke clearly favored industrial development in Central Europe, rather than Germany itself, in part because it was out of reach of Allied bombers. By 1943–1944 half of the Reichswerke iron and steel were produced in the occupied territories, the other half in Germany (including annexed Austria).

The Soviet coal and steel industry captured in 1941–1942 became the Reichswerke's most challenging task. Hitler tasked the Reichswerke with harvesting the abandoned plants as soon as possible. Pleiger compelled the old steel barons of the Ruhr to send in their managing teams and literally "adopt" the Soviet assets. Reluctant steel barons objected but had to comply with Hitler's explicit order. Radical Nazis objected, for different reasons, but could not offer a better solution.

Romanian assets, almost all of the country's coal and steel capacity, were acquired through a series of friendly arrangements and placed under joint German-Romanian control. Particular care was given to the largest Romanian shipyard at Galați. In 1942, the Romanian shipyard signed an agreement for "assistance in technical matters" with the Reichswerke. The shipyard's capital increased eleven-fold, from 50 to 550 million lei. That same year, the Romanian Navy submarines Marsuinul and Rechinul, laid down in 1938, were finally completed. Another notable achievement of that year was the launching of Romania's first locally-built tanker, SRT-128. In 1943, four modified M-class minesweepers were built in Romania from German materials. This German-Romanian collaboration also benefited the Kriegsmarine, as the Romanian shipyard assembled six coastal U-boats between 1942 and 1943. The Romanian shipyard also took part in the assembly of S-boats.

== Restructuring ==
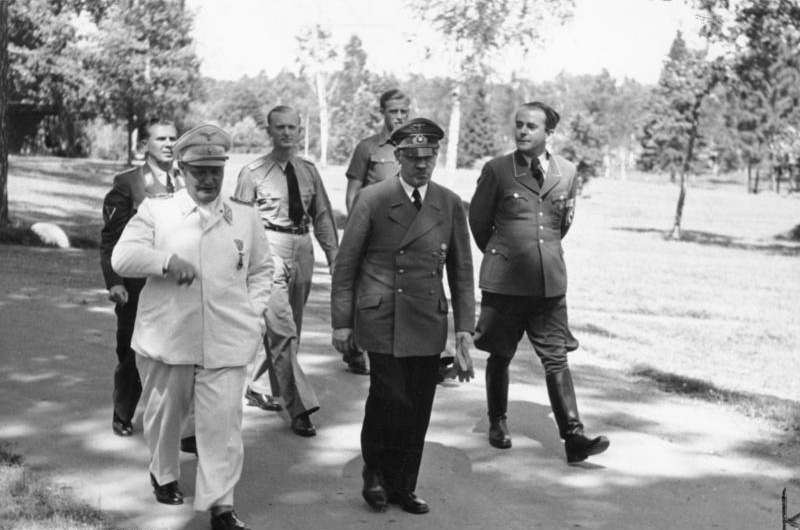
Albert Speer (right) took over weapons and munitions plants from Göring (left) in 1942.

By the end of 1941, the Reichswerke became the largest company in Europe. The conglomerate experienced a series of reorganizations; in January 1941 its assets were arranged in three divisions:

- Block A - Coal, Iron and Steel (Germany, Austria, Bohemia and Moravia, France, Luxembourg, Poland and Romania)
- Block B - Weapons and Munitions (Germany, Austria, Bohemia and Moravia)
- Block C - River and Rail Transportation

A fourth division was added later for captured Soviet assets – Kryvbas and Donets Basin plants and mines in Ukraine, with lesser interests in Belarus, Latvia and central Russia.

The Reichswerke amassed too many plants to run them effectively. Instead of pinpointing the most promising assets, it spread the available resources over everything it had. Its managers did not feel the pressure of competition that shaped the management of private companies. Richard Overy noted that Göring's obsession with long-term mega-projects not only drained the economy, but was in stark contrast with the ideology of blitzkrieg.

Inability to control the huge conglomerate became evident in 1942, and Pleiger persuaded Göring to limit the Reichswerke to coal, iron, and steel production. The Reichswerke passed control over its weapons and munitions plants to Organisation Todt and its successor, the Ministry of Armaments. Still, the organization operated at a loss; in fact, Block A posted losses in every year of its existence, from 1939 to 1945. The French operations fared even worse.

== Liquidation ==
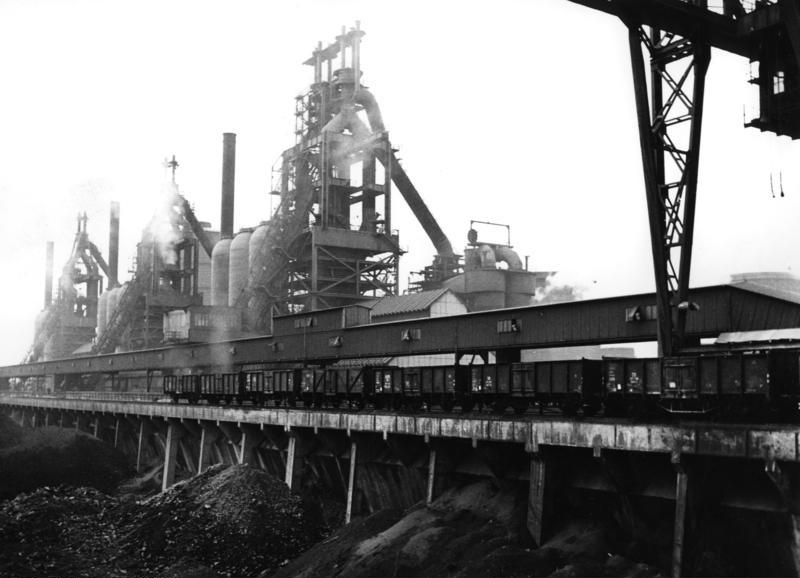
Salzgitter plant in 1961

The assets of the Reichswerke acquired by conquest were recaptured by Allied troops between 1943 and 1945 - these included assets of ARBED (Luxembourg) and Skoda Works.

The Reichswerke assets in allied-occupied Austria were nationalized by the First Nationalization Law enacted by the Austrian parliament on 26 July 1946. The ore mines in Erzberg and the steel mills in Linz, destroyed by allied air raids, were reorganized into the state-owned VÖEST (now part of Voestalpine). Reconstruction of these assets became a key priority of the Marshall Plan in Austria. Nationalization was supported by the US Department of State and opposed by US Army generals, who called for privatization. Steyr-Daimler-Puch, once owned by the Reichswerke and controlled by the US Army, became a pilot model for the private modernization advocated by Mark W. Clark. Eventually the Department of State prevailed and the Austrians were allowed to nationalize the plants at will. The Reichswerke assets in the Soviet zone of occupation were taken over by the Administration for Soviet Property in Austria and returned to Austria for a ransom in 1955.

The Salzgitter furnaces were shut down and earmarked for dismantling, devastating the town's economy. Dismantling began in earnest in 1947 and ended with the demolition of furnaces and foundries. Salzgitter was flooded with forty four thousand German refugees from the East, unemployment exceeded 30%, and the British considered physically resettling the residents in fear of a communist uprising. Of the thirty seven thousand displaced persons (mostly from Poland) working in Salzgitter in 1945, many refused to be resettled, and deportations continued until mid-1950s. In February 1950 the workers stood up against demolition of their plants and eventually won the bloodless standoff with British troops. Dismantling continued for another year, but steelmaking in Salzgitter was saved. The state-owned plant operated under the name Reichswerke until 1953, then it was renamed AG für Bergbau- und Hüttenbetrieb, and eventually became Salzgitter AG. The Reichswerke logo, which resembled Göring's coat of arms, was not replaced until the 1980s.
