= Kurt Baron von Schröder =

German banker, Nazi financier and politician (1889–1966)

Kurt Freiherr von Schröder (24 November 1889 in Hamburg, German Empire – 4 November 1966 in Hamburg, West Germany) was a German nobleman, financier and SS-Brigadeführer. He is most famous for hosting the negotiations between members of Paul von Hindenburg's camarilla, Franz von Papen and Adolf Hitler in order to form a government after the German federal election of November 1932, which earned him the moniker "midwife of Nazism".

== Life ==
Schröder was the second son of Frederick Freiherr von Schröder, a financier, and his wife Harriet Millberg, the daughter of a prominent Hanseaten family. He obtained his university degree in economics from the University of Bonn in 1907 and eventually obtained a commission in the Prussian Army as a cavalry officer. Schröder continued to alternate between his job as a merchant banker and a reserve officer until the outbreak of the First World War, which eventually left him disillusioned after the Armistice of Compiègne. Dissatisfied with the instability of the Weimar Republic, he first joined the center right and pro-monarchist German People's Party led by Gustav Stresemann. After Stresemann's death Schröder increasingly veered towards the nascent National Socialist movement before becoming an influential fundraiser and economic advisor to the NSDAP.

In 1927 Schröder formally joined the Circle of Friends of the Economy, a pro-Hitler lobbying group established by Wilhelm Keppler in order to strengthen ties between prominent industrialists and members of Hitler's inner circle.

Kurt Baron von Schröder was Royal Swedish Consul in Köln 1921-1938, Consul General 1938–1945. He was honoured by being awarded with the Royal Swedish Order of Vasa 1st class in 1928.

== Role in supporting Hitler ==
Schröder's close ties to politicians across the spectrum of the political right allowed him to form a bridge between the center-right, led consecutively by Franz von Papen and Kurt von Schleicher, and then by Adolf Hitler. After von Papen's government fell in the November 1932 election, von Papen asked von Schröder to make an introduction to Hitler at von Schröder's villa in the fashionable Braunsfeld neighbourhood of Cologne, which took place on January 4, 1933, and would earn von Schröder the nickname "midwife of Nazism". Accompanied by Heinrich Himmler and Rudolf Hess, Hitler ranted against von Hindenburg and von Schleicher for several hours during which time von Schröder was unable to moderate the conversation although von Papen and Hitler agreed to continue the conversation further. Von Schröder's matchmaking eventually paved the way for Hitler to be appointed Chancellor in 1933.

== Rewards for support ==
Schröder became chairman of the board of directors of several major companies in Germany and was president of the Rhineland Industrial Chamber in Cologne.

== Postwar ==
After the Second World War, Schröder was arrested and was tried by a German court for membership in a criminal organization. He was found guilty and was sentenced to three months' imprisonment.

Kurt von Schröder died on 4 November 1966.
