= Wilhelm Keppler =

German industrialist, Hitler's economic advisor, SS-Obergruppenführer

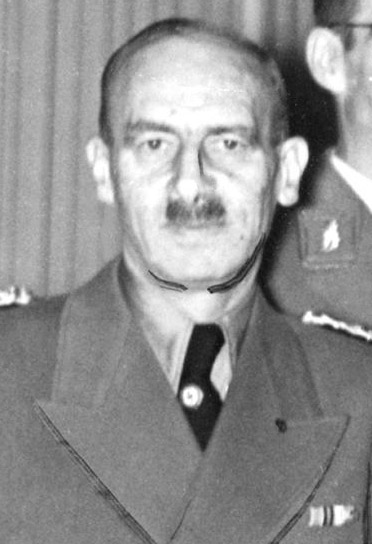
- Keppler in 1939
- Born: 14 December 1882; Heidelberg, Grand Duchy of Baden, German Empire
- Died: 13 June 1960 (aged 77); Friedrichshafen, Baden-Württemberg, West Germany
- Military career
- Allegiance: Nazi Germany
- Branch: Schutzstaffel
- Rank: SS-Obergruppenführer

Wilhelm Karl Keppler (14 December 1882 – 13 June 1960) was a German businessman and one of Adolf Hitler's early financial backers. Introduced to Hitler by Heinrich Himmler, Keppler helped to finance the Nazi Party and later served as one of Hitler's economic advisors.

== Biography ==
Keppler attended Karlsruhe Technical School from 1901 to 1905. He then served in the army between 1903 and 1904 before attending Königliche Technische Hochschule zu Danzig from 1905 to 1910, where he earned his degree in engineering. He was commissioned by the army as a reserve second lieutenant in 1910. Keppler became an engineer in the chemical industry starting in 1911. He fought in the First World War.

Keppler was an engineer and chemical manufacturer at the time that he joined the NSDAP in February 1927 as member #62,424. He co-owned Odin Works, a small photographic gelatin factory, and was chairman of the I. G. Farben subsidiary Braunkohle-Benzin AG. Keppler's business career had given him close ties to the Eastman Kodak Company and other American corporations, with whom he would continue dealing as a Nazi official. U.S. military intelligence would later refer to Keppler as a "Kodak Man". Hitler appointed him as the Nazi Party's economics adviser in December 1931. He was elected to the Reichstag on 5 March 1933, from the Nazi electoral list. At the November 1933 election, he was returned from electoral constituency 32, Baden, a seat that he held until May 1945. In July 1933 he was appointed Reich Commissioner for Economic Affairs (German: Kommissar für Wirtschaftsfragen). This position granted Keppler charge of all party organizations involved with economic policy. After 1934, Keppler faced the problem of securing and utilizing raw materials. In October 1933, he was a founding member of Hans Frank's Academy for German Law and was named to its präsidium, or executive committee.

To strengthen the Nazi Party's ties with business and industry, Keppler founded the Circle of Friends of the Economy (Freundeskreis der Wirtschaft, which is sometimes referred to as the "Keppler Circle"). Keppler joined the SS (#50,816) in August 1932 and founded the Circle of Friends of Heinrich Himmler, which was a continuation of the Keppler Circle.

Considered weak and slow, Keppler's role was supplanted in 1936 by the Four Year Plan. He served as a personal adviser to Hermann Göring on the Four Year Plan. He was given a new title of "general expert of German raw and industrial materials".

He went to Austria in 1938 to prepare the ground for Anschluss. He served as Secretary at the German Embassy in Vienna in 1938, Reich Commissioner in Austria from March to June 1938, then Reich Commissioner in Slovakia in 1939, and finally Reich Commissioner in Danzig in August 1939. Keppler became Secretary of State with special duties in the Foreign Office during World War II, during which he administered SS confiscated industries in Poland and Russia. On 30 January 1942 he became an honorary Obergruppenführer (General) of the SS.

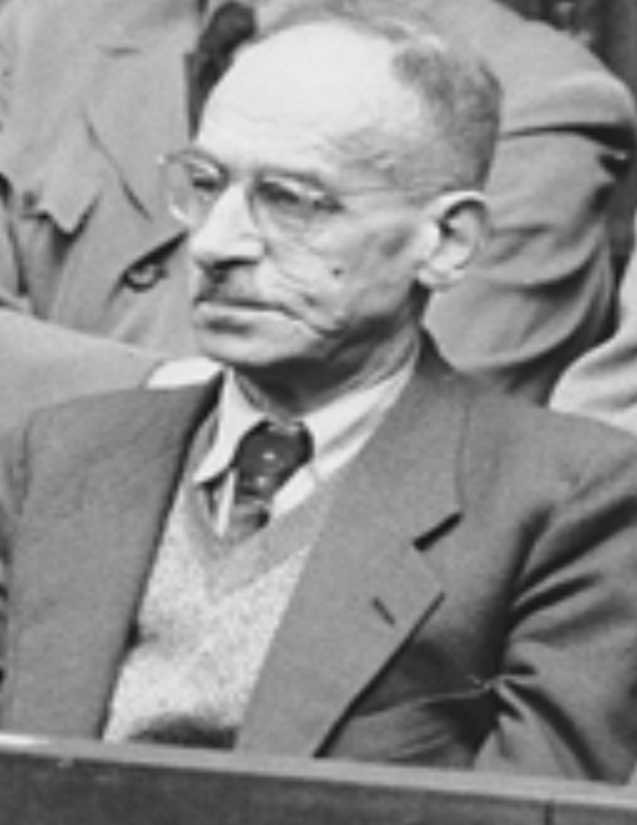
Keppler during his trial

Keppler was sentenced to ten years in prison during the Ministries Trial on 14 April 1949. He was pardoned early on 1 February 1951 by the U.S. High Commission and released from prison. He died on 13 June 1960.

== See also ==
- List SS-Obergruppenführer
