= Oil campaign targets of World War II =

External images
- Map of oil facilities Blechhammer North; Bratislava Apollo refinery Magdeburg/Rothensee Nov '44 Wanna-Eickel bombing photo

Allied bombing of the oil campaign targets of World War II included attacks on Nazi Germany oil refineries, synthetic oil plants, storage depots, and other chemical works. Natural oil was available in Northwestern Germany at Nienhagen (55%—300,000 tons per year), Rietberg (20%—300,000), and Heide (300,000) and refineries were mainly at Hamburg and Hannover. Refineries in France, Holland, and Italy (54)—mainly coastal plants for ocean-shipped crude—were within Allied bombing range and generally unused by Germany (Italian refining ceased in August 1943). Even before the war, Germany was dependent on foreign sources for an adequate supply of oil. The annexations of Austria and the Sudetenland (and the breakup of Czechoslovakia); the "campaigns in Norway, Holland, Belgium, and France…and imports from the Soviet Union provided significant wartime petroleum imports to Nazi Germany. Firms that operated oil facilities included Deutsche Erdöl-Aktiengesellschaft, Brabag (e.g., Böhlen, Magdeburg/Rothensee, Zeitz), Fanto (Pardubice, Budapest), and I.G. Farbenindustrie (Blechhammer, Ludwigshafen/Oppau, Oświęcim).

This table is incomplete; you can help by expanding it.
Type	Germany (Ruhr & Vienna areas)	Germany (other)	Foreign
Bergius plants	Bottrop-Welheim Castrop-Rauxel; Duisburg; Gelsenkirchen (Nordstern); Gelsenkirchen (Scholven/Buer); Homberg; Kamen; Sterkrade/Holten; Wanne-Eickel	Blechhammer Essener Verein; Leuna - most heavily defended oil target in Nazi Germany; Ludwigshafen; Lützkendorf-Mücheln; Wesseling	Poland (Oświęcim)
Fischer- Tropsch plants	Dortmund Kamen-Dortmund; Odertal; Ruhland-Schwarzheide	Lützkendorf-Mücheln Essener Verein	France (Harnes)
Refineries	Austria (Korneuburg) Vienna (Floridsdorf); Vienna (Lobau); Vienna (Moosbierbaum); Vienna (Schwechat); Vienna (Vösendorf)	Bremen Chemnitz; Cottbus; Dortmund; Düsseldorf; Emmerich; Hamburg-Harburg; Hanover; Magdeburg; Mannheim; Mittelwerk (jet fuel); Monheim; Nienhagen; Regensburg (imports); Rositz	Austria (Linz benzol plant) Czechoslovakia (Brüx, Bratislava, Dubová, Kralupy, Kolín, Pardubice); France (Balaruc); France (La Pallice; Hungary (Almásfüzitő); Hungary (Budapest); Hungary (Szőny); Hungary (Pétfürdő); Poland (Czechowice); Poland (Drohobycz); Poland (Trzebinia); Romania (Brașov); Romania (Brazi); Romania (Bucharest); Romania (Câmpina); Romania (Ploiești)
Oil fields		Nienhagen	Hungary (Nagykanizsa)
Oil storage depots	Austria: (Korneuburg)	Bücken Bruges; Dülmen; Ebenhausen; Erfurt; Erbach or Ebrach; Frankfurt am Main; Freiham; Hamburg; Kassel; Marienburg; Munich; Neuenheerse; Roudnice nad Labem; Winterhafen); Würzburg; Underground: Ehmen; Farge; Hitzacker; Loccum; Nienburg	Belgium (Antwerp) France (Dugny); France (Le Pontet); France (Le Pouzin); France (Lyon); France (Montbartier); France (Paris); France (Rouen); France (Sète); Italy (La Spezia); Italy (Porto Marghera); Romania (Constanța); Romania (Giurgiu); Yugoslavia (Belgrade); Yugoslavia (Pula)
