= Intria =

Intria may refer to:

- Intria Items, a Canadian payment and information processing services company part of CIBC bank.
- INTRIA (Nazi Germany), International Trade and Investment Agency in Nazi Germany
