= List of German companies by employees in 1907 =

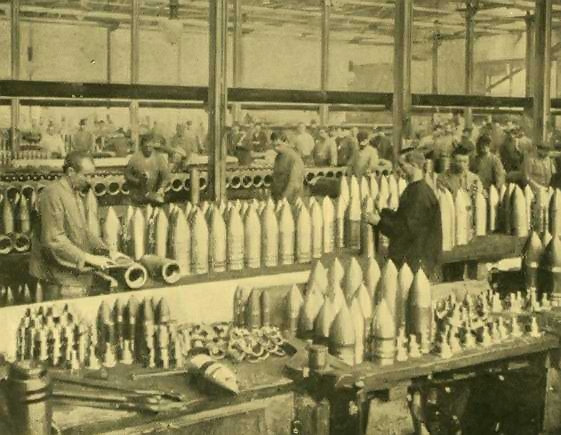
Ammunition production at Friedrich Krupp in 1905.

This is a list of German companies by employees in 1907. The largest 127 companies of the German Empire in 1907 accounted for 7.8 percent of all employees in the German Empire; excluding railways and state-owned enterprises the share was only 3.6 percent. This compares to corresponding percentage shares of 8.2 respectively 4.6 for the United Kingdom at the same time. The largest German companies were predominantly in the heavy industries (mining, coal, iron, iron ore, steel and metals), accounting for 38.7 percent of all employees and the transport and communication sector (railways, postal service, shipping), accounting for 45.4 percent of all employees. State-owned enterprises such as the state railways companies, the postal administration, the Prussian state mines, military workshops and the Imperial shipyards are dominant among the very largest companies.

== Companies by employees ==
The list is based on Wardley (1999), who compiled data from three different sources: the work of Kocka and Siegrist (1979) and Fiedler (1999) on German companies in 1907, and the work of Kunz (1990) on Prussian state-owned enterprises in 1913. Given the shortage of historical employment data some employment numbers are only estimates and some companies might be missing from this list. Employment numbers are including all subsidiaries as long as the parent company is the majority shareholder, that is, holds more than 50 percent of the stock. Employee numbers are not including those employed in foreign subsidiaries. The only two companies in 1907 with large foreign subsidiaries were Siemens with 19.9 percent of the workforce employed abroad (8,542 employees) and Mannesmann with 34 percent of the workforce employed abroad (2,680 employees). With the de Wendel'sche Berg-und Hüttenwerke the list also includes the German subsidiary of the French de Wendel group. Originally this establishment was located in France, but became part of the German empire with the annexation of Alsace-Lorraine in 1871.

Rank	Company	Employees	Industry	Source
1.	Preußische Staatseisenbahnen	486,318	Railway	Fiedler
2.	Deutsche Reichspost	277,116	Postal administration	Fiedler
3.	Preußische Berg-, Hütten-und Salinenverwaltung (English: Prussian state mines)	180,000 (1913 data)	Mining	Kunz
4.	Friedrich Krupp	64,354	Mining and steel	Kocka & Siegrist
5.	Bayerische Staatseisenbahn	55,295	Railway	Fiedler
6.	Sächsische Staatseisenbahn	40,000	Railway	Fiedler
7.	Siemens (Siemens & Halske and Siemens-Schuckert)	34,324	Electrical engineering	Fiedler
8.	Elsass-Lothringen Reichseisenbahn	32,545	Railway	Fiedler
9.	Phoenix AG für Bergbau und Hüttenbetrieb	32,000	Mining and steel	Fiedler
10.	Gelsenkirchener Bergwerks-AG	31,261	Mining and steel	Fiedler
11.	Allgemeine Elektrizitäts-Gesellschaft	30,667	Electrical engineering	Kocka & Siegrist
12.	Preußische Rüstungswerkstätten (English: Prussian military workshops)	30,000(1913 data)	Mechanical engineering	Kunz
13.	Kaiserliche Werften	27,000(1913 data)	Shipbuilding	Kunz
14.	Harpener Bergbau	26,317	Mining	Fiedler
15.	Badische Staatseisenbahnen	25,709	Railway	Fiedler
16.	Norddeutscher Lloyd	25,000	Shipping	Fiedler
17.	Vereinigte Königs- und Laurahütte	24,885	Mining and metals	Fiedler
18.	Gutehoffnungshütte	21,657	Mining and steel	Kocka & Siegrist
19.	Mansfeld'sche Kupferschiefer-bauende Gewerkschaft	21,283	Mining and metals	Kocka & Siegrist
20.	Württembergische Staatseisenbahnen	20,234	Railway	Fiedler
21.	Bergwerksgesellschaft Hibernia	19,109	Mining	Fiedler
22.	Gewerkschaft Deutscher Kaiser	18,931	Mining and steel	Kocka & Siegrist
23.	Gebrüder Stumm GmbH	17,000	Steel	Fiedler
24.	Hamburg-Amerika Linie	17,000	Shipping	Fiedler
25.	von Giesche Erben Bergwerksgesellschaft	13,291	Mining	Kocka & Siegrist
26.	de Wendel'sche Berg-und Hüttenwerke	12,500	Mining and steel	Fiedler
27.	Hohenlohe-Werke	12,367	Mining and steel	Kocka & Siegrist
28.	Kattowitzer AG für Bergbau und Hüttenbetrieb	12,218	Mining and steel	Fiedler
29.	Bochumer Verein	12,173	Mining and steel	Fiedler
30.	Felten & Guilleaume	11,848	Electrical engineering	Fiedler
31.	Dortmunder Union	11,605	Mining and steel	Kocka & Siegrist
32.	Oberschlesische Eisenbahnbedarf	11,500	Mining and steel	Kocka & Siegrist
33.	Deutsch-Luxemburgische Bergwerks- und Hütten-AG	11,038	Mining and steel	Fiedler
34.	Ludwig Loewe & Company	11,000	Mechanical engineering	Fiedler
35.	Vereinigte Maschinenfabrik Augsburg-Nürnberg	10,908	Mechanical engineering	Kocka & Siegrist
36.	Große Berliner Straßenbahn	10,391	Public transport	Fiedler
37.	Borsig	10,000	Rail vehicles	Fiedler
38.	Elsässische Maschinenbau-Gesellschaft Grafenstaden	10,000	Mechanical engineering	Kocka & Siegrist
39.	Schichau-Werke	10,000	Shipbuilding	Fiedler
40.	Schlesische AG für Bergbau und Zinkhütten	10,000	Mining and metals	Kocka & Siegrist
41.	Eschweiler Bergwerksverein	9,648	Mining and steel	Fiedler
42.	Oberschlesische Eisenindustrie	9,500	Metals	Kocka & Siegrist
43.	Rheinische Stahlwerke	9,435	Mining and steel	Fiedler
44.	Rheinpreußen Gewerkschaft	9,277	Mining	Fiedler
45.	Hoesch Eisen-und Stahlwerk	9,183	Mining and steel	Fiedler
46.	Gräflich Henckel von Donnersmarckische Verwaltung	9,122	Metals	Kocka & Siegrist
47.	Badische Anilin-& Soda-Fabrik	8,877	Chemicals	Kocka & Siegrist
48.	Fürstlich Pless'sche Kohlenbergwerke	8,560	Mining	Kocka & Siegrist
49.	Donnersmarckhütte	8,000	Mining and steel	Kocka & Siegrist
50.	Henschel	8,000	Rail vehicles	Kocka & Siegrist
51.	Norddeutsche Wollkämmerei	8,000	Textiles	Kocka & Siegrist
52.	Röchling'sche Eisen-und Stahlwerke	8,000	Steel	Kocka & Siegrist
53.	Villeroy & Boch	8,000	Ceramics	Fiedler
54.	Farbenfabriken Bayer	7,811	Chemicals	Kocka & Siegrist
55.	Mathias Stinnes	7,700	Mining	Kocka & Siegrist
56.	Bismarckhütte	7,505	Steel	Fiedler
57.	Georgs-Marien-Bergwerks- und Hüttenverein	7,296	Mining and steel	Fiedler
58.	Rombacher Hüttenwerke	7,120	Steel	Fiedler
59.	Schalker Gruben- und Hüttenverein	7,091	Steel	Fiedler
60.	Stettiner Maschinenbau Vulkan	6,748	Shipyard	Fiedler
61.	Ewald bei Herten Gewerkschaft	6,500	Mining	Kocka & Siegrist
62.	Kaiserliche Werft Kiel	6,500	Shipbuilding	Fiedler
63.	Thyssen & Co.	6,489	Mechanical engineering	Fiedler
64.	Arenbergische AG für Bergwerk und Hüttenbetrieb	6,292	Steel	Fiedler
65.	Consolidation Bergwerks AG	6,000	Mining	Kocka & Siegrist
66.	Hoechster Farbwerke	6,000	Chemicals	Kocka & Siegrist
67.	Zollverein Gewerkschaft	5,958	Mining	Fiedler
68.	Gerresheimer Glashüttenwerk	5,800	Glass	Fiedler
69.	Preußische Bergwerksdirektion Recklinghausen	5,745	Mining	Fiedler
70.	Concordia Bergbau	5,741	Mining	Fiedler
71.	Constantin der Große Verein Gewerkschaft	5,583	Mining	Kocka & Siegrist
72.	Leop. Engelhardt & Biermann Cigarettenfabrik	5,523	Tobacco	Fiedler
73.	Ilseder Hütte	5,400	Steel	Fiedler
74.	Deutsch-Österreichische Mannesmannröhren-Werke AG	5,200	Steel	Fiedler
75.	Continental-Caoutchouc-Companie	5,185	Rubber	Fiedler
76.	König Ludwig Gewerkschaft	5,157	Mining	Kocka & Siegrist
77.	Graf von Ballestremische Güterverwaltung	5,000	Mining	Kocka & Siegrist
78.	Gräflich Schaffgotschische Werke GmbH	5,000	Mining	Kocka & Siegrist
79.	Mülheimer Bergwerksverein	4,933	Mining	Fiedler
80.	Julius Pintsch AG	4,918	Mechanical Engineering	Fiedler
81.	Essener Steinkohlenbergwerke	4,840	Mining	Kocka & Siegrist
82.	Eisenhüttenwerke Thale	4,795	Steel	Fiedler
83.	Lothringer Hüttenverein Aumetz-Friede	4,700	Steel	Fiedler
84.	Blohm + Voss	4,630	Shipbuilding	Fiedler
85.	Breslauer AG für Eisenbau-Wagenbau	4,600	Rail vehicles	Fiedler
86.	Gewerkschaft des Steinkohlenbergwerks Neumühl	4,600	Mining	Fiedler
87.	Strassen-Eisenbahn-Gesellschaft Hamburg	4,500	Public Transport	Fiedler
88.	Württembergische Metallwarenfabrik	4,500	Metalware	Fiedler
89.	Deutsche Bank	4,439	Banking	Fiedler
90.	Buderus'sche Eisenwerke	4,400	Steel	Kocka & Siegrist
91.	Vereinigte Gummiwaaren-Fabrik	4,320	Rubber	Fiedler
92.	Oberschlesische Kokswerke & Chemische Fabrik	4,259	Coal products and chemicals	Kocka & Siegrist
93.	Graf Bismarck Gewerkschaft	4,234	Mining	Fiedler
94.	Riebeck'sche Montanwerke	4,104	Chemicals	Kocka & Siegrist
95.	Friedrich der Große Gewerkschaft	4,076	Mining	Kocka & Siegrist
96.	Aktien-Gesellschaft Weser	4,059	Shipbuilding	Fiedler
97.	AG für Bergbau-, Blei-und Zinkfabrikation	4,025	Metals	Kocka & Siegrist
98.	Bergmann Elektricitäts-Werke	4,000	Electrical engineering	Fiedler
99.	Chemische Fabrik Griesheim-Elektron	4,000	Chemicals	Kocka & Siegrist
100.	Deutsche Gasglühlicht (Auer-Gesellschaft)	4,000	Electrical engineering	Fiedler
101.	Luxemburger Bergwerk und Saarbrückener Eisenhütte	4,000	Steel	Fiedler
102.	Rheinische Metallwaren-und Maschinenfabrik	4,000	Mechanical engineering	Kocka & Siegrist
103.	Sächsische Maschinenfabrik	4,000	Mechanical engineering	Fiedler
104.	Königsborn AG für Bergbau	3,927	Mining	Kocka & Siegrist
105.	Lauchhammer AG	3,774	Steel	Fiedler
106.	Saar-und Mosel Bergwerks Gesellschaft	3,758	Mining	Fiedler
107.	Hannoversche Maschinenbau AG	3,744	Mechanical engineering	Fiedler
108.	Dortmunder Steinkohlebergwerk Louise Tiefbau	3,724	Mining	Fiedler
109.	Orenstein & Koppel	3,700	Mechanical engineering	Kocka & Siegrist
110.	Bergwerksgesellschaft Dahlbusch	3,600	Mining	Fiedler
111.	Maschinenfabrik Gritzner	3,595	Mechanical engineering	Fiedler
112.	Gasmotorenfabrik Deutz	3,470	Mechanical engineering	Kocka & Siegrist
113.	Maschinenbauanstalt Humboldt	3,470	Mechanical engineering	Fiedler
114.	Essener Bergwerksverein König Wilhelm	3,277	Mining	Fiedler
115.	Zeche Königin Elisabeth	3,150	Mining	Kocka & Siegrist
116.	Berlin Anhaltische Maschinenbau	3,117	Mechanical engineering	Kocka & Siegrist
117.	Deutsche Reichsbank	3,084	Banking	Fiedler
118.	Adlerwerke vormals Heinrich Kleyer	3,000	Mechanical engineering	Fiedler
119.	Berliner Maschinenbau Schwartzkopff	3,000	Rail vehicles	Fiedler
120.	Kammgarnspinnerei Stöhr	3,000	Textiles	Kocka & Siegrist
121.	Gewerkschaft Lothringen	3,000	Mining	Kocka & Siegrist
122.	Gewerkschaft Mont Cenis	2,978	Mining	Kocka & Siegrist
123.	Saar- und Mosel-Bergwerks-Gesellschaft	2,933	Mining	Kocka & Siegrist
124.	Gebrüder Körting	2,800	Mechanical engineering	Kocka & Siegrist
125.	Gewerkschaft Vereinigte Helene & Amalie	2,598	Mining	Kocka & Siegrist
126.	Gebrüder Stollwerck	2,500	Food	Kocka & Siegrist
127.	Portland-Cement-Fabrik AG Heidelberg	2,500	Cement	Kocka & Siegrist

== See also ==
- Economic history of Germany
- List of companies by employees
- List of German companies by employees in 1938
- German company law
- UK company law
