= 1944 Hochdahl-Trills Handley Page Halifax shootdown =

1944 aviation incident in Germany

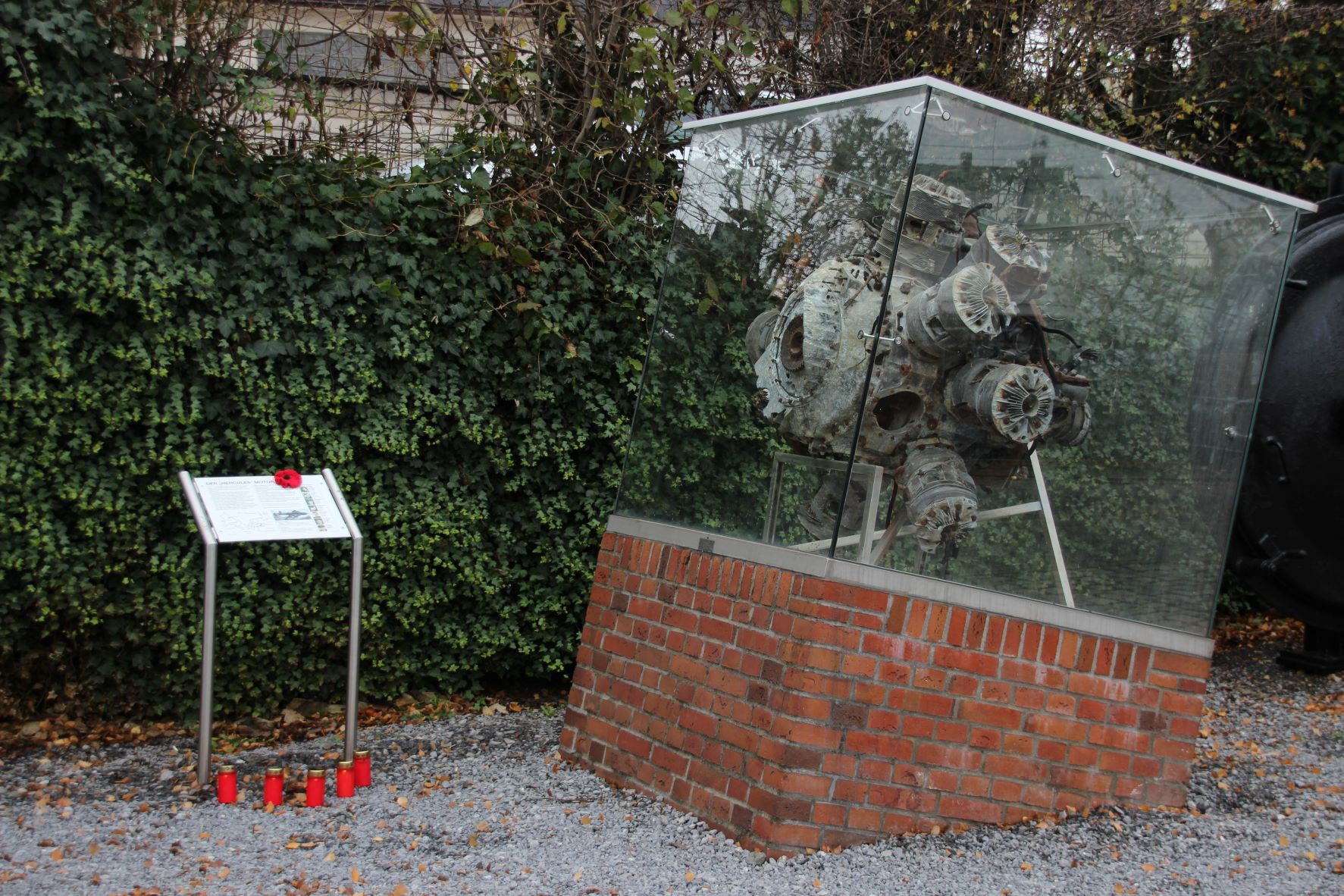
- Memorial and display at Erkrath-Hochdahl museum

Occurrence
- Date: 21 November 1944
- Summary: Shot down by German night fighter after bombing raid on Castrop-Rauxel
- Site: Hochdahl-Trills, Erkrath, Nazi Germany

Aircraft
- Aircraft type: Handley Page Halifax
- Aircraft name: Halifax NP810
- Operator: Royal Canadian Air Force
- Registration: NP810 (EQ-H)
- Flight origin: RAF Linton-on-Ouse, England
- Destination: Castrop-Rauxel, Germany (target)
- Crew: 8
- Fatalities: 6
- Injuries: 2
- Survivors: 2

The 1944 Hochdahl-Trills Handley Page Halifax shootdown occurred on 21 November 1944 during World War II when a four-engine British Royal Air Force bomber, operated by the Royal Canadian Air Force, crashed near the Catholic Church of St. Franziskus in Hochdahl-Trills, now part of the city of Erkrath, Germany.

== Mission ==
In the afternoon of 21 November 1944, a Handley Page Halifax bomber (serial NP810, code EQ-H) took off from RAF Linton-on-Ouse in eastern England. The aircraft belonged to the No. 408 Squadron, part of the No. 6 Group RCAF. Its target was a hydrogenation plant in Castrop-Rauxel, located at the Zeche Victor colliery in the district of Ickern, which produced synthetic oil from coal using the Fischer–Tropsch process.

A total of 258 aircraft reached the target, dropping 952 tons of high-explosive bombs, including nine 4,000-pound “blockbusters” and eight tons of incendiaries. The plant and surrounding residential areas were severely damaged. The attack killed 15 people, injured 31, and destroyed 113 houses.

A post-mission analysis revealed that many bombs were dropped too far south onto uninhabited terrain. Likely causes included errors in target marking by the Pathfinder Force, wind-drift of parachute flares ("Christmas trees"), or the creepback effect—where psychological stress led bombardiers to release their loads prematurely, resulting in a shift in bomb impacts.

== Shootdown ==
Shortly after releasing its payload near Velbert-Langenberg, the Halifax was attacked by a German Messerschmitt Bf 110 G-4 night fighter (callsign G9+AM) from IV./Nachtjagdgeschwader 1 (NJG 1). The crew included Hauptmann Fritz Lau (pilot), Feldwebel Backhaus (radio operator), and Unteroffizier Reinecke (gunner). Lau approached from the rear, hit the bomber, and set it on fire. The aircraft flew a few more kilometers before exploding midair over Hochdahl-Trills at 19:10.

== Crash site ==
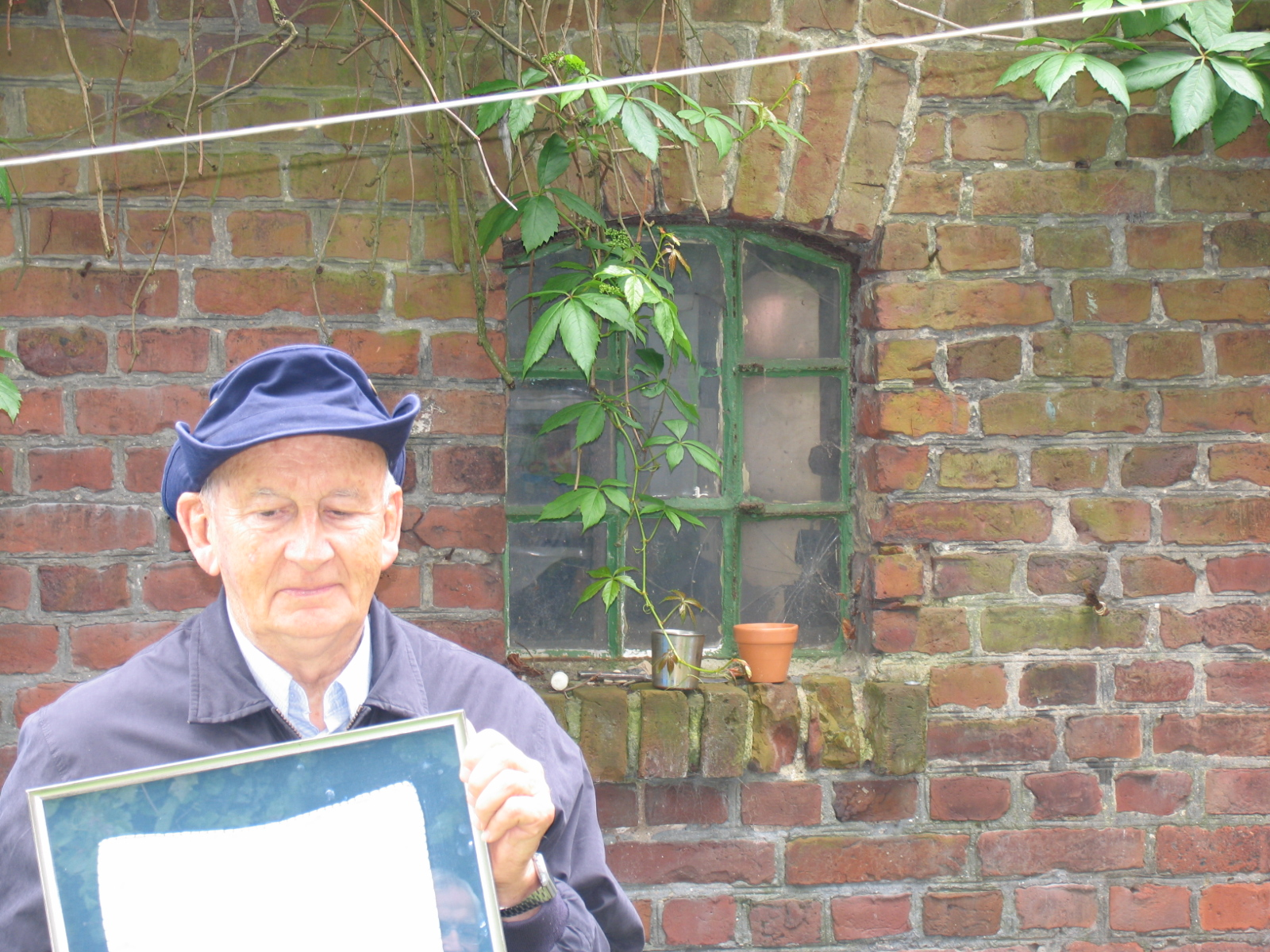
Jim McPhee with parachute fragment at the crash site

Debris fell next to the Catholic Church of St. Franziskus, narrowly missing it. In his parish chronicle, Father Karl Fassbender described how part of the aircraft landed in the rectory garden as a massive fire burned across the street. One of the four Bristol Hercules engines fell about 200 meters away into a small pond at Gut Clef, remaining submerged until the 1970s when it resurfaced and was later displayed by the property owner.

== Crew ==
- Flight Lieutenant Albert Edward Steeves (pilot, RCAF) ordered the crew to bail out. He parachuted and landed severely injured near Kneteisen (now part of Haan), and was hospitalized in Haan before being sent to Stalag Luft I in Barth. He survived the war and died in 1986.
- Sergeant James Alexander McPhee (rear gunner, RCAF) escaped the burning bomber, losing consciousness during his fall, but managed to deploy his parachute moments before landing on a washhouse roof. Slightly injured, he evaded capture for six days before being handed over to police by local farmers. He was imprisoned in Stalag Luft VII and later in Stalag III-A in Luckenwalde. He died in 2019 in Barrie, Canada.
- Pilot Officer Edmond Kenneth Wilson (radio operator, RCAF) was found severely injured near the crash and taken to a POW hospital in Düsseldorf. He died later that evening.

The following crew members were killed and found near the crash site:

- Sergeant Herbert Edgar Clark – flight engineer (RAF)
- Pilot Officer Louis Basarab – mid-upper gunner (RAF)
- Pilot Officer Lloyd William Frizzell – bomb aimer (RCAF)
- Flying Officer Adelbert Bateman Rowley – navigator (RCAF)

== Commemoration ==
In 2005, prompted by a 1986 photo of the engine, volunteers from the LVR Office for Monument Preservation began researching the incident. Jim McPhee and John Clark, son of Herbert Clark, visited the crash site on 2 June 2006. McPhee received a piece of his parachute that had been turned into a handkerchief.

In 2007, the recovered engine was moved to the Railway and Local History Museum of Erkrath-Hochdahl, located just a few hundred meters from the crash site. It was placed under glass and officially unveiled in August 2010.

In 2024, 80 years after the accident, there was a special commemoration.
