= Economy of Nazi Germany =

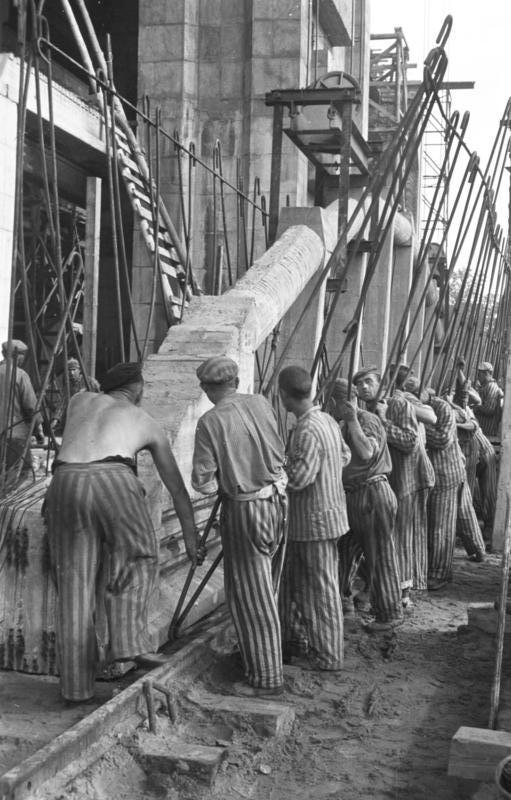
- Prisoner work-force in the construction of the Valentin submarine pens for U-boats, in 1944
- Currency: Reichsmark (ℛ︁ℳ︁)
- Fiscal year: 1 January–31 December (calendar year)

Statistics
- Population: 79,375,281 (1939)
- GDP: $77.07 billion in 1933; $80.99 billion in 1945
- GDP per capita: $237.67 in 1933; $417.77 in 1945
- Unemployment: ~30% (1933); <1% (1939)
- Main industries: Defense; agriculture; chemicals; steel; heavy industries; motor vehicles; aerospace; textiles

External
- Exports: $1.166 billion (1933); $1.285 billion (1938)
- Imports: $1.0 billion (1933); $1.261 billion (1938)
- Import goods: Petroleum; grain; rubber; manganese; tungsten; chromium; iron; ball bearings
- Main import partners: Spain, Sweden, Portugal, Romania, Soviet Union, Italy, Japan, Turkey
- Gross external debt: $520 million (1939)

Public finance
- Government debt: $15.2 billion (1939)
- Revenue: $24.8 billion (1933-1939)
- Spending: $40.4 billion (1933-1939)
- All values, unless otherwise stated, are in US dollars.

Like many other countries at the time, Germany suffered the economic effects of the Great Depression in the early 1930s, with unemployment soaring after the Wall Street crash of 1929. After Adolf Hitler became Chancellor of Germany in January 1933, he introduced policies aimed at improving the economy. The changes included privatization of state-owned industries, tariffs, and an attempt to achieve autarky (national economic self-sufficiency). Weekly earnings increased by 19% in real terms from 1933 to 1939, but this largely resulted from employees working longer hours, while the hourly wage-rates remained close to the lowest levels reached during the Great Depression. Reduced foreign trade would mean rationing of consumer goods like poultry, fruit, and clothing for many Germans.

The Nazis believed in war as the primary engine of human progress, and saw the purpose of a country's economy as enabling that country to fight and win wars of expansion. As such, almost immediately after coming to power, they embarked on a vast program of military rearmament, which quickly dwarfed civilian investment. During the 1930s, Nazi Germany increased its military spending faster than any other state in peacetime, and the military sector eventually came to represent the majority of the German economy in the 1940s. Before World War II this was funded mainly through deficit financing: the Nazis expected to cover the debt by plundering the wealth of conquered regions during and after the fighting. Such plundering did occur, but its results fell far short of Nazi expectations. Several scholars have described the Nazi economy as dirigiste. Overall, according to historian Richard Overy, the Nazi war economy was a mixed economy that combined free markets with central planning; Overy describes it as being somewhere in between the communist economy of the Soviet Union and the market economy of the United States.

The Nazi government developed partnerships with leading German business-interests, which supported the goals of the régime and its war effort in exchange for advantageous contracts, subsidies, and the suppression of the trade-union movement. Cartels and monopolies were encouraged at the expense of small businesses, even though the Nazis had received considerable electoral support from owners of small businesses.

Nazi Germany maintained a supply of slave labor, composed of prisoners and concentration-camp inmates, which expanded greatly after the beginning of World War II. In Poland alone, some five million people worked as slave laborers throughout the war. Among the slave laborers in the occupied territories, hundreds of thousands were used by leading German corporations including Thyssen, Krupp, IG Farben, Bosch, Blaupunkt, Daimler-Benz, Demag, Henschel, Junkers, Messerschmitt, Siemens, and Volkswagen, as well as the Dutch corporation Philips. By 1944, slave labor made up one-quarter of Germany's entire civilian work-force, and the majority of German factories had a contingent of prisoners.

== Pre-war: 1933–1939 ==
=== Recovery and rearmament ===
Germany's gross national product (GNP) and GNP deflator, year on year change in percentages, from 1926 to 1939

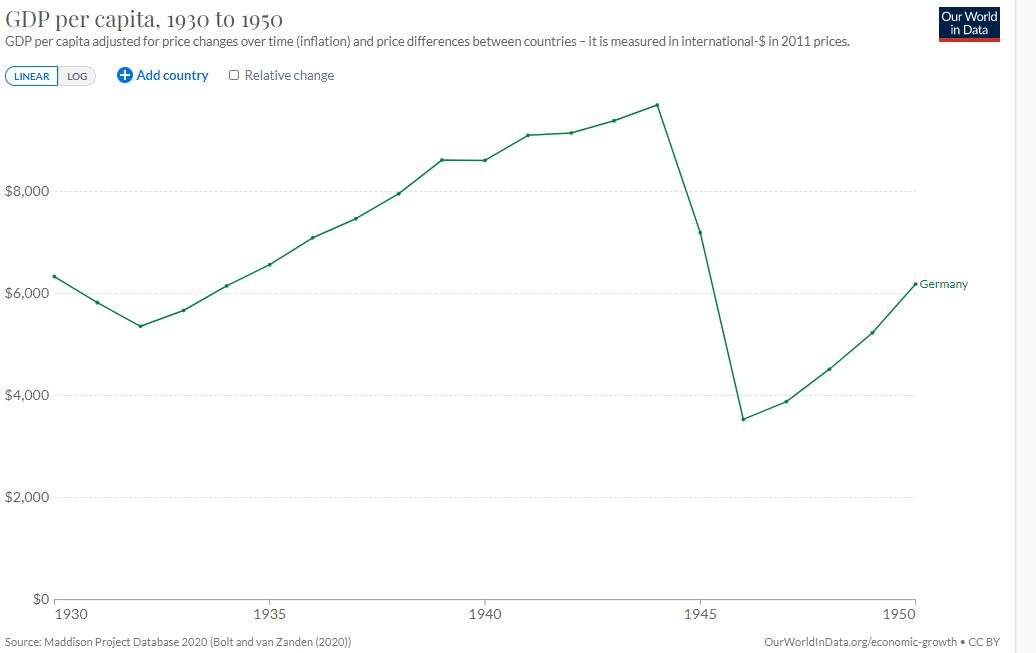
Development of GDP per capita, from 1930 to 1950

The Nazis came to power in the midst of the Great Depression. The unemployment rate at that point in time was close to 30%. At first, the new Nazi government continued the economic policies introduced by the government of Kurt von Schleicher in 1932 to combat the effects of the Depression. Hitler appointed Hjalmar Schacht, a former member of the German Democratic Party, as President of the Reichsbank in 1933 and Minister of Economics in 1934. The policies he inherited included large public works programs supported by deficit spending—such as the construction of the Autobahn network—to stimulate the economy and reduce unemployment. These were programs that were planned to be undertaken by the Weimar Republic during conservative Paul von Hindenburg's presidency, and which the Nazis appropriated as their own after coming to power. Hjalmar Schacht created a scheme for deficit financing, in which capital projects were paid for with the issuance of promissory notes called Mefo bills, which could be traded by companies with each other. Schacht was one of the few finance ministers at the time to take advantage of the end of the gold standard to increase deficit spending. This was particularly useful in allowing Germany to rearm because the Mefo bills were not Reichsmarks and did not appear in the federal budget, so they helped conceal rearmament. When the notes were presented for payment, the Reichsbank printed money. This proved inadequate in 1938, when a large share of Mefo's five-year promissory notes fell due, so the government employed "highly dubious methods" where "banks were forced to buy government bonds, and the government took money from savings accounts and insurance companies" in order to pay the holders of Mefo bills, due mainly to a serious government cash shortage. Meanwhile, Schacht's administration achieved a rapid decline in the unemployment rate, the largest of any country during the Great Depression. By 1938, unemployment was practically extinct. Price controls kept inflation in check but also squeezed out small farmers. The government also introduced rent and wage controls.

The main economic priority of the Nazi government, which set it apart from previous German governments, was to rearm and rebuild Germany's military in preparation for an eventual war to conquer Lebensraum ('living space') in the East. Thus, at the beginning of his rule, Hitler said that "the future of Germany depends exclusively and only on the reconstruction of the Wehrmacht. All other tasks must cede precedence to the task of rearmament" and "in case of conflict between the demands of the Wehrmacht and demands for other purposes, the interests of the Wehrmacht must in every case have priority." This policy was implemented immediately, with military expenditures quickly growing far larger than the civilian work-creation programs. As early as June 1933, military spending for the year was budgeted to be three times larger than the spending on all civilian work-creation measures in 1932 and 1933 combined. Nazi Germany increased its military spending faster than any other state in peacetime, with the share of military spending rising from 1 percent to 10 percent of national income in the first two years of the regime alone. Eventually, it reached as high as 75 percent by 1944.

The first financial package for rearmament was adopted by the Nazi government in June 1933, and it was extremely ambitious. Schacht approved a figure of 35 billion ℛ︁ℳ︁ (equivalent to €162.2 billion in 2021), to be spent on military buildup over eight years. By comparison, the entire national income of Germany in 1933 was 43 billion ℛ︁ℳ︁ (equivalent to €199.3 billion in 2021), so the government was not merely proposing to increase military spending, but to make military production the primary focus of the national economy. Earlier in April, the cabinet had already agreed to release the military from the normal processes of budgetary oversight. Germany's international treaty obligations would not allow such extensive rearmament, so Hitler withdrew from the Geneva disarmament talks and from the League of Nations in October 1933. The German government feared that this might provoke immediate war with France at the time, but it did not. Still, the fear that war might come before Germany was prepared for it served to create a sense of urgency and reinforced the rearmament program.

The army and the navy prepared to quickly expand their capacity and manpower. Plans were made to secretly build an air force, and the army prepared to introduce conscription within two years and grow to 300,000 soldiers by 1937 (both were in violation of the Treaty of Versailles). At first, the navy did not benefit much from these rearmament plans, because Hitler wished to fight a land war in Europe and even hoped to make an alliance with the British Empire whereby the British would retain control of the seas. However, at the insistence of Admiral Erich Raeder, an expansion of the navy was also approved in 1934. This included the projected construction of 8 battleships (Versailles permitted 6), 3 aircraft carriers, 8 cruisers (Versailles permitted 6), 48 destroyers (Versailles permitted 12), and 72 submarines (completely banned by the treaty). The unprecedented size of the military budget was impossible to hide from foreign observers. When Hitler was asked for an explanation, he claimed that Germany was "engaged only in essential maintenance and renewal expenditure."

The enormous military buildup was financed to a large extent through deficit spending, including Mefo bills. Between 1933 and 1939 the total revenue of the German government amounted to 62 billion ℛ︁ℳ︁, equivalent to €275.8 billion in 2021. Meanwhile, government expenditure (up to 60% of which consisted of rearmament costs) exceeded 101 billion ℛ︁ℳ︁, equivalent to €449.3 billion in 2021, thus causing a huge deficit and rising national debt (reaching 38 billion ℛ︁ℳ︁ in 1939, equivalent to €169.0 billion in 2021). Joseph Goebbels, who otherwise mocked the government's financial experts as narrow-minded misers, expressed concern in his diary about the exploding deficit. The main concern was that the deficit could lead to high inflation. The government avoided inflation by keeping wages low, which they were able to do because the Nazis "destroyed the labor movement and instituted a reign of terror in the workplace." Hitler and his economic team expected that the upcoming territorial expansion would provide the means of repaying the soaring national debt, by using the wealth and manpower of conquered nations.

In general, the Nazi government continued the policies of previous German governments towards private and public enterprises. Little changed in the relationship between business and government in the early 1930s, as the Nazis tried to use existing industry to meet their goals of military buildup and autarky. There was no interference by the state in private industry as long as business leaders were willing to cooperate, but some uncooperative industrialists in areas important for the future war effort, such as aircraft manufacturer Hugo Junkers, were removed from their positions.

An elaborate bureaucracy was created to regulate imports of raw materials and finished goods with the intention of eliminating foreign competition in the German marketplace and improving the nation's balance of payments. The Nazis encouraged the development of synthetic replacements for materials such as oil and textiles. As the market was experiencing a glut and prices for petroleum were low, the Nazi government made a profit-sharing agreement with IG Farben in 1933, guaranteeing them a 5 percent return on capital invested in their synthetic oil plant at Leuna. Any profits in excess of that amount would be turned over to the Reich. By 1936, Farben regretted making the deal, as the excess profits by then being generated had to be given to the government.

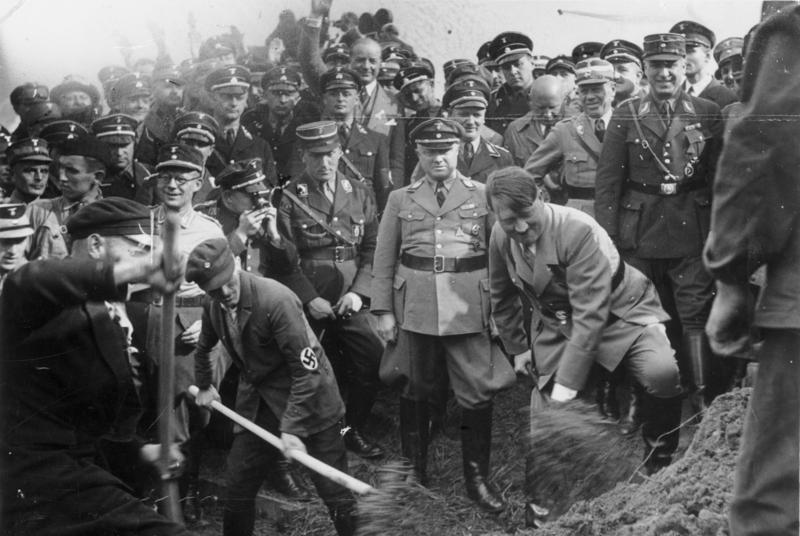
Hitler at a groundbreaking ceremony for a new section of the Reichsautobahn highway system, in 1933

In June 1933, the "Reinhardt Program" for infrastructure development was introduced. It combined indirect incentives, such as tax reductions, with direct public investment in waterways, railroads and highways. It was followed by similar initiatives resulting in great expansion of the German construction industry. Between 1933 and 1936, employment in construction rose from only 666,000 to over 2,000,000. Cars and other forms of motorized transport became increasingly attractive to the population, and the German motor industry boomed. However, Germany's attempt to achieve autarky meant imposing restrictions on foreign currency, which caused a shortage of rubber and fuel for civilian use by 1939 and resulted in "drastic restrictions on the use of motor vehicles".

=== Privatization and business ties ===
The Great Depression had spurred increased state ownership in most Western capitalist countries. This also took place in Germany during the last years of the Weimar Republic. However, after the Nazis took power, industries were privatized en masse. Several banks, shipyards, railway lines, shipping lines, welfare organizations, and more were privatized. The Nazi government took the stance that enterprises should be in private hands wherever possible. State ownership was to be avoided unless it was absolutely necessary for rearmament or the war effort, and even in those cases "the Reich often insisted on the inclusion in the contract of an option clause according to which the private firm operating the plant was entitled to purchase it." However, the privatization was "applied within a framework of increasing control of the state over the whole economy through regulation and political interference," as laid out in the 1933 Act for the Formation of Compulsory Cartels, which gave the government a role in regulating and controlling the cartels that had been earlier formed in the Weimar Republic under the Cartel Act of 1923. These had mostly regulated themselves from 1923 to 1933.

Companies privatized by the Nazis included the four major commercial banks in Germany, which had all come under public ownership during the prior years: Commerz– und Privatbank, Deutsche Bank und Disconto-Gesellschaft, Golddiskontbank and Dresdner Bank. Also privatized were the Vereinigte Stahlwerke A.G. ('United Steelworks'), the second largest joint-stock company in Germany (the largest was IG Farben) and Vereinigte Oberschlesische Hüttenwerke AG, a company controlling all of the metal production in the Upper Silesian coal and steel industry. Shares in the Deutsche Reichsbahn ('German Railways'), at the time the largest single public enterprise in the world, were slated to be sold in the fiscal year 1934-1935. The government also sold a number of shipbuilding companies, and enhanced private utilities at the expense of municipally owned utilities companies. Additionally, the Nazis privatized some public services which had been previously provided by the government, especially social and labor-related services, and these were mainly taken over by organizations affiliated with the Nazi Party that could be trusted to apply Nazi racial policies.

One of the reasons for the Nazi privatization policy was to cement the partnership between the government and business interests. Hitler believed that the lack of a precise economic programme was one of the Nazi Party's strengths, saying: "The basic feature of our economic theory is that we have no theory at all". Another reason was financial. As the Nazi government faced budget deficits due to its military spending, privatization was one of the methods it used to raise more funds. Between the fiscal years 1934–35 and 1937–38, privatization represented 1.4 percent of the German government's revenues. There was also an ideological motivation. Nazi ideology held entrepreneurship in high regard, and "private property was considered a precondition to developing the creativity of members of the German race in the best interest of the people." The Nazi leadership believed that "private property itself provided important incentives to achieve greater cost consciousness, efficiency gains, and technical progress." Adolf Hitler used Social Darwinist arguments to support this stance, cautioning against "bureaucratic managing of the economy" that would preserve the weak and "represent a burden to the higher ability, industry and value."

The month after being appointed Chancellor, Hitler made a personal appeal to German business leaders to help fund the Nazi Party for the crucial months that were to follow. He argued that the experience of Weimar Republic had shown that "'private enterprise cannot be maintained in the age of democracy.' Business was founded above all on the principles of personality and individual leadership. Democracy and liberalism led inevitably to Social Democracy and Communism." In the following weeks, major corporations shifted their policy from financial contributions spread among several parties to ensure good will, to concentration on the Nazi Party. The Party received contributions from seventeen different business groups, with the largest coming from IG Farben and Deutsche Bank. Many of these businesses continued to support Hitler even during the war and even profited from persecution of the Jews. The most infamous being firms like Krupp, IG Farben, and large automobile manufacturers such as the Ford Motor Company. Historian Adam Tooze writes that the leaders of German business were therefore "willing partners in the destruction of political pluralism in Germany." In exchange, owners and managers of German businesses were granted unprecedented powers to control their workforce, collective bargaining was abolished and wages were frozen at a relatively low level. Business profits also rose very rapidly, as did corporate investment.

The Nazis granted millions of marks in credits to private businesses. Many businessmen had friendly relations to the Nazis, most notably with Heinrich Himmler and his Freundeskreis der Wirtschaft. Hitler's administration decreed an October 1937 policy that "dissolved all corporations with a capital under $40,000 and forbade the establishment of new ones with a capital less than $200,000," which swiftly effected the collapse of one-fifth of all small corporations. Meanwhile, large cartels were strengthened, and a law passed on July 15, 1933 allowed the Ministry of Economics to organize new cartels or to compel firms to join existing ones. In 1934, the Nazi regime introduced a new law on securities trading that favored large companies, and in December of that year it "limited the distribution of dividends to 6 percent, so that profits would be reinvested into companies." Generally, Nazi government policies "favored big corporations and the transformation of smaller corporations (juristische Personengesellschaften or Körperschaften) to private firms (Personalgesellschaften)." They also favored domestic businesses and restricted flows of foreign exchange. From 1938, foreign exchange dealings were no longer allowed at German stock markets.

The rhetoric of the Nazi regime stated that German private companies would be protected and privileged as long as they supported the economic goals of the government—mainly by participating in government contracts for military production—but that they could face severe penalties if they went against the national interest. However, such threats were rarely carried out in practice, and historians Christoph Buccheim and Jonas Scherner state that "companies normally could refuse to engage in an investment project designed by the state without any consequences." Private firms refused government contracts and directions on many occasions. In 1937, de Wendel, a coal mining enterprise, refused to build a hydrogenation plant. In 1939, IG Farben denied a government request to increase its production of rayon and refused to invest in a synthetic rubber factory despite this being an important project for the regime. Froriep GmbH, a company producing machines for the armaments industry, successfully demanded cheap credit from the Nazi government under a threat of cutting back investment if its demand was not met. The regime generally used monetary incentives, such as guaranteed profits, to persuade businesses to support its goals, and freedom of contract was generally respected even in projects important for the war. According to Buccheim and Scherner, the reason why businesses sometimes refused these incentives was out of long-term profitability considerations. The government usually tried to persuade them to join military projects, but firms were worried about overcapacity in case the armaments boom would end. They did not want to commit themselves too much to war-related production for the future.

Other historians dispute the Buccheim and Scherner thesis that the general absence of state coercion means there was no real threat of it. They believe that many industrialists feared direct state intervention in private industries if the Nazi government's goals were not fulfilled, and that their choices were affected by this concern. Peter Hayes argues that although the Nazi regime "wished to harness business's energy and expertise" and "generally displayed flexibility in order to obtain them, usually by offering financing options that reduced the risk of producing what the regime desired", the government was nevertheless also willing to resort to direct state intervention as a "Plan B" in some cases, and these cases "left an impression on the corporate world, all the more so as government spokesmen repeatedly referred to them as replicable precedents." Thus, the Nazi state did not resort to "blunt-instrument forms of coercion" because it did not need to, not because it was unwilling to do so. After 1938, "examples had been made, fear inspired, and the lessons internalized, on both sides of the business-state divide." Hayes describes Nazi economic policies as a "'carrot-and-stick' or 'Skinner Box' economy" in which corporate decisions "were increasingly channeled in directions the regime desired" through a combination of "government funding and state-guaranteed profit margins" on the one hand, and a series of regulations, penalties, "the possibility of government compulsion, and the danger that refusal to cooperate could open opportunities to competitors," on the other hand. As such, he argues that "the Third Reich both bridled and spurred the profit motive." Hayes concludes that "Nazi economic policies structured opportunities and thus corporate executives' choices. Did businessmen retain free will? Of course, they did. Was their autonomy intact? I think not."

=== Social policies ===
The Nazis were hostile to the idea of social welfare in principle, upholding instead the Social Darwinist concept that the weak and feeble should perish. They condemned the welfare system of the Weimar Republic as well as private charity, accusing them of supporting people regarded as racially inferior and weak, who should have been weeded out in the process of natural selection. Nevertheless, faced with the mass unemployment and poverty of the Great Depression, the Nazis found it necessary to set up charitable institutions to help those they deemed to be racially-pure Germans in order to maintain popular support, while arguing that this represented "racial self-help" and not indiscriminate charity or universal social welfare. Thus, Nazi programs such as the Winter Relief of the German People and the broader National Socialist People's Welfare (NSV) were organized as quasi-private institutions, officially relying on private donations from Germans to help others of their race—although in practice those who refused to donate could face severe consequences. Unlike the social welfare institutions of the Weimar Republic and the Christian charities, the NSV distributed assistance on explicitly racial grounds. It provided support only to those who were "racially sound, capable of and willing to work, politically reliable, and willing and able to reproduce." Non-Aryans were excluded, as well as the "work-shy," "asocials" and the "hereditarily ill." Efforts were made to involve middle-class women in social work assisting large families, and the Winter Relief campaigns were used as a ritual to generate public sympathy. Meanwhile, in addition to being excluded from receiving aid under these programs, the physically disabled and homeless were actively persecuted, being labeled "life unworthy of life" or "useless eaters."

Various anti-labor laws were passed during the years of Nazi rule. The Law on Company Representation of April 1933, for instance, cut back the rights of the work councils, while the Law on the Trustees of Labour introduced the following month abolished free collective bargaining. Commenting on the labor stance of the Nazi Party, one study has argued that

Anyone who had imagined that, given their anti-union propaganda, the National Socialists might certainly obstruct the trade unions but stop short of destroying them was deceived. The assumption that an industrialized country could not do without trade unions to represent and integrate working people proved an illusion. Very quickly the National Socialist rulers were trying to construct a social order in tune with their ideology, and in this order there was no room for the independent, self-determined representation of workers’ interests. Does it need emphasizing that the NSDAP was anything but a socialist party?

The Nazis banned all trade unions that existed before their rise to power, and replaced them with the German Labour Front (DAF), controlled by the Nazi Party. They also outlawed strikes and lockouts. The stated goal of the German Labour Front was not to protect workers, but to increase output, and it brought in employers as well as workers. Journalist and historian William L. Shirer wrote that it was "a vast propaganda organization ... a gigantic fraud." Meanwhile, the Chamber of Economics (whose president was appointed by the Reich minister of economics) absorbed all existing chambers of commerce. By 1934 these two groups merged somewhat when the Chamber of Economics also became the economics department of the DAF. To aid this, a board of trustees run by representatives of the Nazi Party, the DAF and the Chamber of Economics was set up to centralize their economic activity.

When it came to retail and small business, in order to coordinate workers and small businessmen, shop councils and the so-called Courts of Honour were set up to monitor retail units. Unlike Italian Fascism, Nazism perceived workers and employers in each enterprise as families; each with different roles. This was shown in their tax structure. The Nazis allowed industries to deduct from their taxable income all sums used to purchase new equipment. Rich families employing a maid were allowed to count the maid as a dependent child and reap the tax benefit.

Real wages in Germany dropped by roughly 25% between 1933 and 1938. Along with the abolition of the right to strike, workers were also in large part rendered unable to quit their jobs. Labor books were introduced in 1935, and the consent of the previous employer was required in order to be hired for another job.

=== Foreign trade relations ===
In the 1930s, world prices for raw materials (which constituted the bulk of German imports) were on the rise. At the same time, world prices for manufactured goods (Germany's chief exports) were falling. The result was that Germany found it increasingly difficult to maintain a balance of payments. A large trade deficit seemed almost inevitable. But Hitler found this prospect unacceptable. Germany began to move away from partially free trade in the direction of economic self-sufficiency. Hitler was aware of the fact that Germany lacked reserves of raw materials, and full autarky was therefore impossible. Thus he chose a different approach. The Nazi government tried to limit the number of its trade partners, and, when possible, only trade with countries within the German sphere of influence. A number of bilateral trade agreements were signed between Germany and other European Countries (mostly countries located in Southern and Southeastern Europe) during the 1930s. The German government strongly encouraged trade with these countries but strongly discouraged trade with any others. In February 1933 (the first month of his chancellorship), Hitler promoted the imposition of tariffs, which his economic minister Alfred Hugenberg announced would apply to agriculture.

By the late 1930s, the aims of German trade policy were to use economic and political power to make the countries of Southern Europe and the Balkans dependent on Germany. The German economy would draw its raw materials from that region, and the countries in question would receive German manufactured goods in exchange. Germany would also leverage productive trade relationships with Spain, Switzerland and Sweden in areas ranging from iron ore imports and clearing and payment services. Throughout the 1930s, German businesses were also encouraged to form cartels, monopolies and oligopolies, whose interests were then protected by the state.

Reduced foreign trade would mean rationing of consumer goods like poultry, fruit, and clothing for many Germans.

=== Preparations for war ===
In 1936, after years of limitations imposed by the Versailles Treaty, military spending in Germany rose to 10% of GNP, higher than any other European country at the time, and, from 1936 onward, even higher than civilian investments. Hitler faced a choice between conflicting recommendations. On one side a "free market" technocratic faction within the government, centered around Reichsbank President Hjalmar Schacht, Minister of Economics Walther Funk and Price Commissioner Dr. Carl Friedrich Goerdeler calling for decreased military spending, free trade, and a moderation in state intervention in the economy. This faction was supported by some of Germany's leading business executives, most notably Hermann Duecher of AEG, Robert Bosch of Robert Bosch GmbH, and Albert Voegeler of Vereinigte Stahlwerke. On the other side the more politicized faction favored autarkic policies and sustained military spending. Hitler hesitated before siding with the latter, which was much in line with his fundamental ideological tenets: social darwinism and Lebensraum's aggressive policies. So in August 1936, Hitler issued his "Memorandum" requesting from Hermann Göring a series of Year's Plans (the term "Four-Year Plan" was coined only later, in September) in order to mobilize the entire economy, within the next four years, and make it ready for war: maximizing autarchic policies, even at a cost for the German people, and having the armed forces fully operational and ready at the end of the four years period.

The year 1936 also represented a turning point for German trade policy. In September, Hjalmar Schacht was replaced by Hermann Göring, who was given the task to make Germany self-sufficient and able to wage war within four years. Measures enacted under Göring included slashing imports, instituting wage and price controls (with violations punishable by internment in a concentration camp), and restricting dividends to six percent on book capital. New strategic goals were introduced for the purpose of making Germany ready for war, including the construction of synthetic rubber plants, more steel plants, and automatic textile factories.

Richard Overy has argued for the importance of the August 1936 Memorandum by stressing that it was written personally by Hitler, who hardly ever wrote anything down. The "Four-Year Plan Memorandum" predicated an imminent all-out, apocalyptic struggle between "Judeo-Bolshevism" and German National Socialism, which necessitated a total effort at rearmament regardless of the economic costs.

In the memo, Hitler wrote:

Since the outbreak of the French Revolution, the world has been moving with ever increasing speed toward a new conflict, the most extreme solution of which is called Bolshevism, whose essence and aim, however, are solely the elimination of those strata of mankind which have hitherto provided the leadership and their replacement by worldwide Jewry. No state will be able to withdraw or even remain at a distance from this historical conflict...It is not the aim of this memorandum to prophesy the time when the untenable situation in Europe will become an open crisis. I only want, in these lines, to set down my conviction that this crisis cannot and will not fail to arrive and that it is Germany's duty to secure her own existence by every means in face of this catastrophe, and to protect herself against it, and that from this compulsion there arises a series of conclusions relating to the most important tasks that our people have ever been set. For a victory of Bolshevism over Germany would not lead to a Versailles treaty, but to the final destruction, indeed the annihilation of the German people...I consider it necessary for the Reichstag to pass the following two laws: 1) A law providing the death penalty for economic sabotage and 2) A law making the whole of Jewry liable for all damage inflicted by individual specimens of this community of criminals upon the German economy, and thus upon the German people.

Hitler called for Germany to have the world's "first army" in terms of fighting power within the next four years and that "the extent of the military development of our resources cannot be too large, nor its pace too swift" [italics in the original] and the role of the economy was simply to support "Germany's self-assertion and the extension of her Lebensraum". Hitler went on to write that given the magnitude of the coming struggle that the concerns expressed by members of the "free market" faction like Schacht and Goerdeler that the current level of military spending was bankrupting Germany were irrelevant. Hitler wrote that: "However well balanced the general pattern of a nation's life ought to be, there must at particular times be certain disturbances of the balance at the expense of other less vital tasks. If we do not succeed in bringing the German army as rapidly as possible to the rank of premier army in the world ... then Germany will be lost!" and "The nation does not live for the economy, for economic leaders, or for economic or financial theories; on the contrary, it is finance and the economy, economic leaders and theories, which all owe unqualified service in this struggle for the self-assertion of our nation".

Germany had already been rapidly rearming and militarizing before 1936. However, it was in his memorandum of 1936 that Hitler made it clear he expected war to be imminent. He argued that the German economy "must be fit for war within four years." Autarky was to be pursued more aggressively, and the German people would have to begin making sacrifices in their consumption habits in order to enable food supplies and raw materials to be diverted toward military uses. Despite Nazi propaganda frequently depicting German families as well-dressed and driving new Volkswagen cars, consumption stagnated in the pre-war economy, with few people being able to afford cars. Speaking to a meeting of his main economic advisers in 1937, Hitler insisted that Germany's population had grown to the point where the nation would soon become unable to feed itself, so war for the conquest of Lebensraum in Eastern Europe was necessary as soon as possible. Therefore, if the rearmament drive caused economic problems, the response would have to entail pushing even harder in order to be ready for war faster, rather than scaling back military spending. Seeing that Hitler had taken this stance, Schacht resigned as Minister of Economics in November 1937, and the management of the economy effectively passed to Hermann Göring.

In July 1937, the Reichswerke Hermann Göring was established as a new industrial conglomerate to extract and process domestic iron ores from Salzgitter, as the first step in a general effort to increase German steel production in preparation for war. It produced steel from low grade iron at rates unprofitable to other steel companies. The Nazis had originally tried to persuade the steel industry of the Ruhr to use low-grade domestic ore instead of the high-grade ore imported from Sweden, in order to reduce Germany's reliance on imported raw materials. However, business leaders in the steel industry rejected this plan, so the Reichswerke Hermann Göring was created instead, to begin steel production in a new location. The American engineering firm Brassert was contracted to design and build the first new plant, and construction began in 1938. Brassert and the Nazi Party envisioned this as a project to build the largest steel works in the world, but that goal was never fully achieved. At first, the Reichswerke began as one of the smaller German iron and steel corporations, but it was able to expand rapidly after the German annexation of Austria in 1938, by acquiring large sections of Austrian heavy industry ranging from raw material production, to armaments manufacture, to sales and distribution. A number of the Austrian firms acquired by the Reichswerke had owned stock in smaller foreign businesses as well, so the Reichswerke became the owner or co-owner of various coal, iron, and steel companies across Central Europe even before the outbreak of war. In spite of this, production of iron and steel continued to fall short of the demands of the growing military buildup, so "it became people's patriotic duty to surrender any old or unused metal objects to the authorities", and scrap metal was also collected from factories, churches, and cemeteries. The German occupation of Czechoslovakia in 1938-39 enabled the Reichswerke to undergo another major expansion immediately prior to the war, by acquiring shares in Czech coal mines, armaments firms, and iron and steel manufacturers. Initially these were not necessarily majority shares, as French and British shareholders also held significant stock in Czech companies, and the Reichswerke had to negotiate with them until war was declared. Later, during the war, the Reichswerke would expand by incorporating over 500 companies in key German industries and much of the heavy industry of occupied nations, including between 50 and 60 per cent of Czech heavy industries and slightly less in Austria. By the end of 1941, the Reichswerke had become the largest company in Europe, after absorbing most of the industry captured by Germany from the Soviet Union. While being under German control, the Reichswerke had the great majority of its assets and workforce located outside of Germany, since it had grown largely by absorbing non-German companies from conquered territories before and during the war. 70 per cent of its net assets and 76.5 per cent of its workforce were outside of the Reich by 1943, and even those inside the Reich were mainly in Austria and the Sudetenland, not within the borders of pre-1938 Germany.

== War: 1939–1945 ==
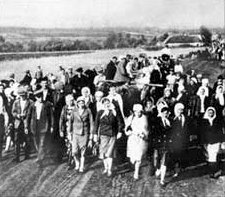
Cherkashchyna Ukrainians being deported to Germany to serve as slave labor (Ostarbeiter), 1942

=== Early conditions ===
The beginning of World War II hostilities resulted in an Anglo-French blockade which seriously restricted German access to world markets. Petroleum, sugar, coffee, chocolate and cotton all became extremely scarce. Germany used coal gasification to replace petroleum imports to a limited extent, and relied on Romanian oilfields at Ploiești. Germany was dependent on Sweden for the majority of their iron-ore production, and relied on Spain and Portugal to provide tungsten. Switzerland continued to trade with Germany, and was very useful as a neutral country not entirely unfriendly to Germany. Until the Axis invasion of the Soviet Union in June 1941, the Third Reich received large supplies of grain and raw materials from the USSR, which they paid for with industrial machinery, weapons, and even German designs for a battleship. In the spring of 1940, the Soviet Union asked for two chemical plants as compensation for raw materials. The German government declined, at the insistence of its military.

Berlin introduced rationing for domestic consumers in 1939. However, while Britain immediately put their economy on a war footing as soon as the conflict began, Germany resisted equivalent measures until later in the war. For instance, the Nazis were reluctant to increase taxes on individual German citizens to pay for the war, so the top rate of personal income tax for an income of 10,000 ℛ︁ℳ︁ in 1941 was 13.7% in Germany, as opposed to 23.7% in Great Britain. The German government instead funded much of its military effort through plunder, especially plundering the wealth of Jews and the like, both at home and in conquered territories.

=== Conquered territories ===
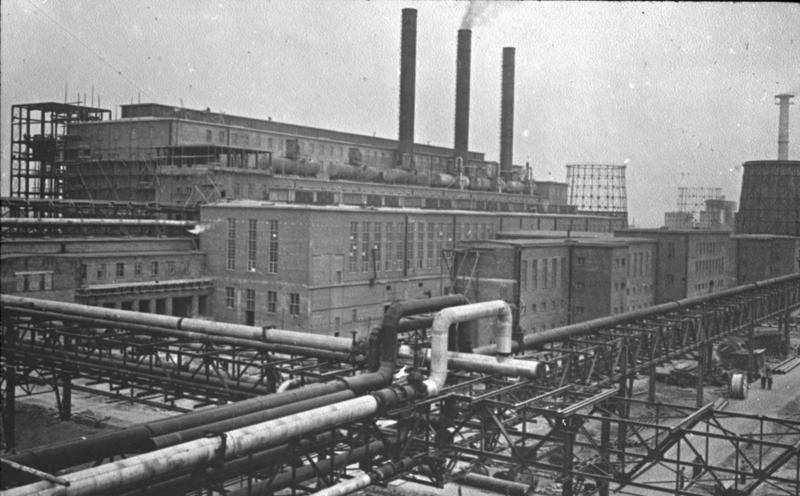
Rubber production plant at the Monowitz concentration camp (Auschwitz III)

During the war, as Germany acquired control of new territories (by direct annexation, by military administration, or by installing puppet governments in defeated countries), these new territories were forced by the Nazi administration to sell raw materials and agricultural products to German buyers at extremely low prices. Hitler's policy of lebensraum strongly emphasized the conquest of new lands in the East, and the exploitation of these lands to provide cheap goods to Germany. In practice, however, the intensity of the fighting on the Eastern Front and the Soviet scorched-earth policy meant that the Germans found little they could use in the Soviet Union, and, on the other hand, a large quantity of goods flowed into Germany from conquered lands in Western Europe. For example, two-thirds of all French trains in 1941 were used to carry goods to Germany. Norway lost 20% of its national income in 1940 and 40% in 1943.

Fiscal policy also emphasized the exploitation of conquered countries, from which capital was to be gathered for German investments. German-run banks, such as the Bank of Issue in Poland (Bank Emisyjny w Polsce), were established to manage local economies.

The destruction caused by the war, however, meant that the conquered territories never operated as productively as Germany had hoped. Agricultural supply-chains collapsed, partly due to wartime destruction and partly due to the British blockade that prevented the import of fertilizer and other raw materials from outside of Europe. The grain harvest in France in 1940 was less than half what it had been in 1938. Grain yields also fell (compared to their pre-war levels) in Germany itself, as well as in Hungary and in the occupied Netherlands and Yugoslavia. German grain imports from Yugoslavia and Hungary fell by almost 3 million tons, and this could only be partially offset by increased deliveries from Romania. Coal and oil were also in short supply, again because Germany could not access sources outside of Europe. Germany's oil supplies, crucial for the war effort, depended largely on annual imports of 1.5 million tons of oil, mainly from Romania. Although Germany seized the oil supplies/reserves of conquered states—for example reducing France to a mere 8 percent of its pre-war oil consumption – this was still not enough for the needs of the war. Acute fuel-shortages forced the German military to cut back on training for its drivers and pilots, because training would waste fuel. The Soviets and the Americans had accurate reports of Germany's oil supplies, but refused to believe that the Nazi government would take the risk of starting a war with so little fuel security, so they assumed that Germany must have had vast amounts of well-hidden supplies that they were not able to detect. Germany also had a problem with coal, although in this case the issue was not a lack of quantity, but an inability to extract it and transport it where it was needed fast enough. Railways had been badly damaged by the war, and coal miners in occupied territories drastically reduced their productivity compared to pre-war levels. This was, in part, deliberate sabotage on the part of the miners, who wished to harm the German war-effort. But it was also in part due to lack of adequate nutrition for those miners, as food from their countries was redirected to Germany.

In 1942, after the death of Armaments Minister Fritz Todt, Hitler appointed Albert Speer as his replacement. Historians have long contended that the growing burdens of the war saw Germany move to a full war-economy under the efficient (Note: For a critical assessment of Speer's performance see Tooze (2006), pp. 552–.) leadership of Speer. However, historian Richard Overy contends this is a myth based on the flimsy conclusions of the Strategic Bombing Survey, which relied on the views of one German official from the German Statistical Office, Rolf Wagenführ. Wagenführ was not senior enough to be aware of decision-making at higher levels. Overy shows that the military and Nazi leadership were particular about preparing the German economy for total war, as they felt that Germany had lost World War I on the Home front.

=== Forced labor ===
Even before the war, Nazi Germany maintained a supply of slave labor. "Undesirables" (German: unzuverlässige Elemente), such as the homeless, non-whites, homosexuals, and alleged criminals as well as political dissidents, communists, Freemasons, Jews, Jehovah's Witnesses, Slavs, and anyone else that the regime wanted out of the way were imprisoned in labor camps. Prisoners of war and civilians were brought into Germany from occupied territories after the German invasion of Poland. The necessary labor for the German war economy was provided by the new camp system, serving as one of the key instruments of terror. Historians estimate that some 5 million Polish citizens (including Polish Jews) went through them.

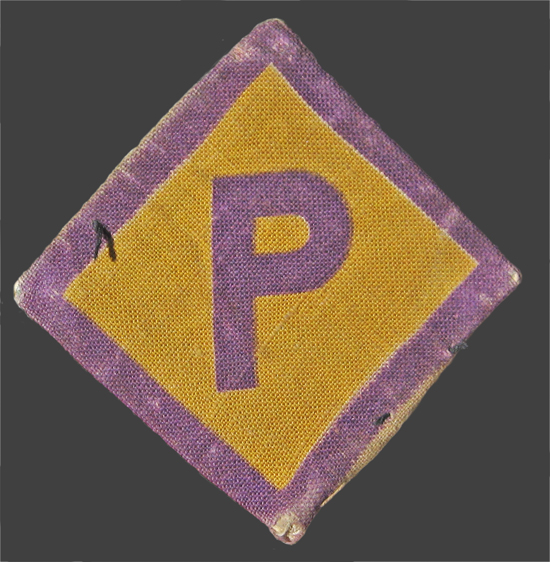
The badge imposed on Polish forced workers

A network of slave-labor camps—457 complexes with dozens of subsidiary camps, scattered over a broad area of German-occupied Poland—exploited to the fullest the labor of their prisoners, in many cases working inmates to their death. At the Gross-Rosen concentration camp (to which Polish nationals were brought in from the annexed part of Poland) the number of subcamps was 97. Under Auschwitz, Birkenau, and Auschwitz III (Monowitz) with thousands of prisoners each, the number of satellite camps was 48. Stutthof concentration camp had 40 subcamps officially and as many as 105 subcamps in operation, some as far as Elbląg, Bydgoszcz and Toruń, 200 kilometres (120 mi) from the main camp. The Deutsche Reichsbahn acquired new infrastructure in Poland worth in excess of 8,278,600,000 zł., including some of the largest locomotive factories in Europe, the H. Cegielski – Poznań renamed DWM, and Fablok in Chrzanów renamed Oberschlesische Lokomotivwerke Krenau as well as the locomotive parts factory Babcock-Zieleniewski in Sosnowiec renamed Ferrum AG later tasked with making parts to V-1 and V-2 rockets also. Under the new management, formerly Polish companies began producing German engines BR44, BR50 and BR86 as early as 1940 with the use of slave labor.

Hundreds of thousands of people in occupied territories were used as slave labor by leading German corporations including Thyssen, Krupp, IG Farben, Bosch, Blaupunkt, Daimler-Benz, Demag, Henschel, Junkers, Messerschmitt, Philips, Siemens, Walther, and Volkswagen, on top of Nazi German startups which ballooned during this period, and all German subsidiaries of foreign firms including Fordwerke (Ford Motor Company) and Adam Opel AG (a subsidiary of General Motors). By 1944, slave labor made up one-quarter of Germany's entire work force, and the majority of German factories had a contingent of prisoners. In rural areas the shortage of agricultural labor was filled by forced laborers from the occupied territories of Poland and the Soviet Union. The children of these workers were unwanted in Germany, and usually murdered inside special centers known as Ausländerkinder-Pflegestätte.

=== Military production ===
The proportion of military spending in the German economy began growing rapidly after 1942, as the Nazi government was forced to dedicate more of the country's economic resources to fight a losing war. Civilian factories were converted to military use and placed under military administration. From mid 1943 on, Germany switched to a full war economy overseen by Albert Speer. By late 1944, almost the entire German economy was dedicated to military production. The result was a dramatic rise in military production, with an increase by 2 to 3 times of vital goods like tanks and aircraft, despite the intensifying Allied air campaign and the loss of territory and factories. Restaurants and other services were closed to focus the German economy on military needs. With the exception of ammunition for the army, the increase in production was insufficient to match the Allies in any category of production. Some production was moved underground in an attempt to put it out of reach of Allied bombers.

From late 1944 on, Allied bombings were destroying German factories and cities at a rapid pace, leading to the final collapse of the German war economy in 1945 (Stunde Null). Food became drastically scarce. Synthetic fuel production dropped by 86% in eight months, explosive output was reduced by 42% and the loss of tank output was 35%. The Allied bombing campaign also tied up valuable manpower, with Albert Speer (Germany's Minister of Armaments) estimating that in the summer of 1944 between 200,000 and 300,000 men were permanently employed in repairing oil installations and placing oil production underground.

== Historiography ==
A major historiographical debate about the relationship between the German pre-war economy and foreign policy decision-making began in the late 1980s, when historian Timothy Mason claimed that an economic crisis had caused a "flight into war" in 1939. Mason argued that the German working-class was opposed to the Nazi dictatorship in the over-heated German economy of the late 1930s. However, Mason's thesis was opposed by historian Richard Overy who wrote that Germany's economic problems could not explain aggression against Poland and that the reasons for the outbreak of war were due to the ideological choices made by the Nazi leadership. For Overy, the problem with Mason's thesis was that it rested on the assumptions not shown by records. Overy argued that there was a difference between economic pressures induced by the problems of the Four Year Plan, and economic motives to seize foreign industry, materials and reserves of neighboring states. Meanwhile, Adam Tooze argued that from 1939 onward, in spite of the military successes in the West, the German economy became dependent on vital imports from the East. Tooze saw this as a reason for Hitler to attack the Soviet Union, because "[t]he Third Reich had no intention of slipping into that kind of humbling dependence that Britain now occupied in relation to the United States, mortgaging its assets and selling its secrets, simply to sustain its war effort". Up to Operation Barbarossa the German economy could not "do without Soviet deliveries of oil, grain, and alloy metals." The Four-Year Plan was discussed in the controversial Hossbach Memorandum, which provides the "minutes" from one of Hitler's briefings. The Four-Year Plan technically expired in 1940.

== See also ==
- Behemoth: The Structure and Practice of National Socialism
- Economics of fascism
- Economic history of Germany
- Extermination through labor
- Forced labor in Germany during World War II
- International Trade and Investment Agency
- List of German companies by employees in 1938

== Sources ==
- Braun, Hans-Joachim (1990). The German Economy in the Twentieth Century. Routledge. ISBN 9780415021012.
- Bry, Gerhard [in German] (1960). Wages in Germany 1871–1945. New Jersey: Princeton University Press. LCCN 60005762. OCLC 233980. OL 5794123M.
- Buchheim, Christoph; Scherner, Jonas (June 2006). "The Role of Private Property in the Nazi Economy: The Case of Industry" (PDF). The Journal of Economic History. Cambridge University Press.
- Carr, William (1972). Arms, Autarky and Aggression. London: Edward Arnold.
- Dawidowicz, Lucy (1976). A Holocaust Reader. New York: Behrman House. ISBN 978-0-87441-219-2.
- DeLong, J. Bradford (February 1997). "Slouching Towards Utopia?: The Economic History of the Twentieth Century. XV. Nazis and Soviets". econ161.berkeley.edu. University of California at Berkeley. Archived from the original on May 11, 2008.
- Evans, Richard J. (2005). The Third Reich in Power. New York: Penguin. ISBN 978-0-14-303790-3.
- Hayes, Peter (October 16, 2008). "Corporate Freedom of Action in Nazi Germany" (PDF). Lecture at the German Historical Institute, Washington. Archived from the original (PDF) on January 11, 2021.
- Grunberger, Richard (1971). The 12-Year Reich: A Social History of Nazi Germany, 1933–1945. New York: Holt, Rinehart and Winston. ISBN 0-03-076435-1.
- Overy, Richard J. (1994). War and Economy in the Third Reich. New York: Oxford University Press. ISBN 978-0-198-20599-9.
- Schweitzer, Arthur (1964). Big Business in the Third Reich. Bloomington: Indiana University Press.
- Shirer, William Lawrence (1960). The Rise and Fall of the Third Reich: A History of Nazi Germany. New York City: Simon & Schuster. ASIN B0766DKDLR. LCCN 60006729. OCLC 1286630. OL 5794925M. Wikidata Q138029595.
- Shirer, William Lawrence (2011). The Rise and Fall of the Third Reich: A History of Nazi Germany. New York City: Simon & Schuster. ISBN 978-1-4516-5168-3. OCLC 756654223. OL 26444916M. Wikidata Q124536560.
- Tooze, Adam (2006). The Wages of Destruction: The Making and the Breaking of the Nazi Economy. New York: Viking. ISBN 978-0-670-03826-8.
