= Bombing of Hamburg in World War II =

Bombing of Hamburg
- Part of the strategic bombing during World War II
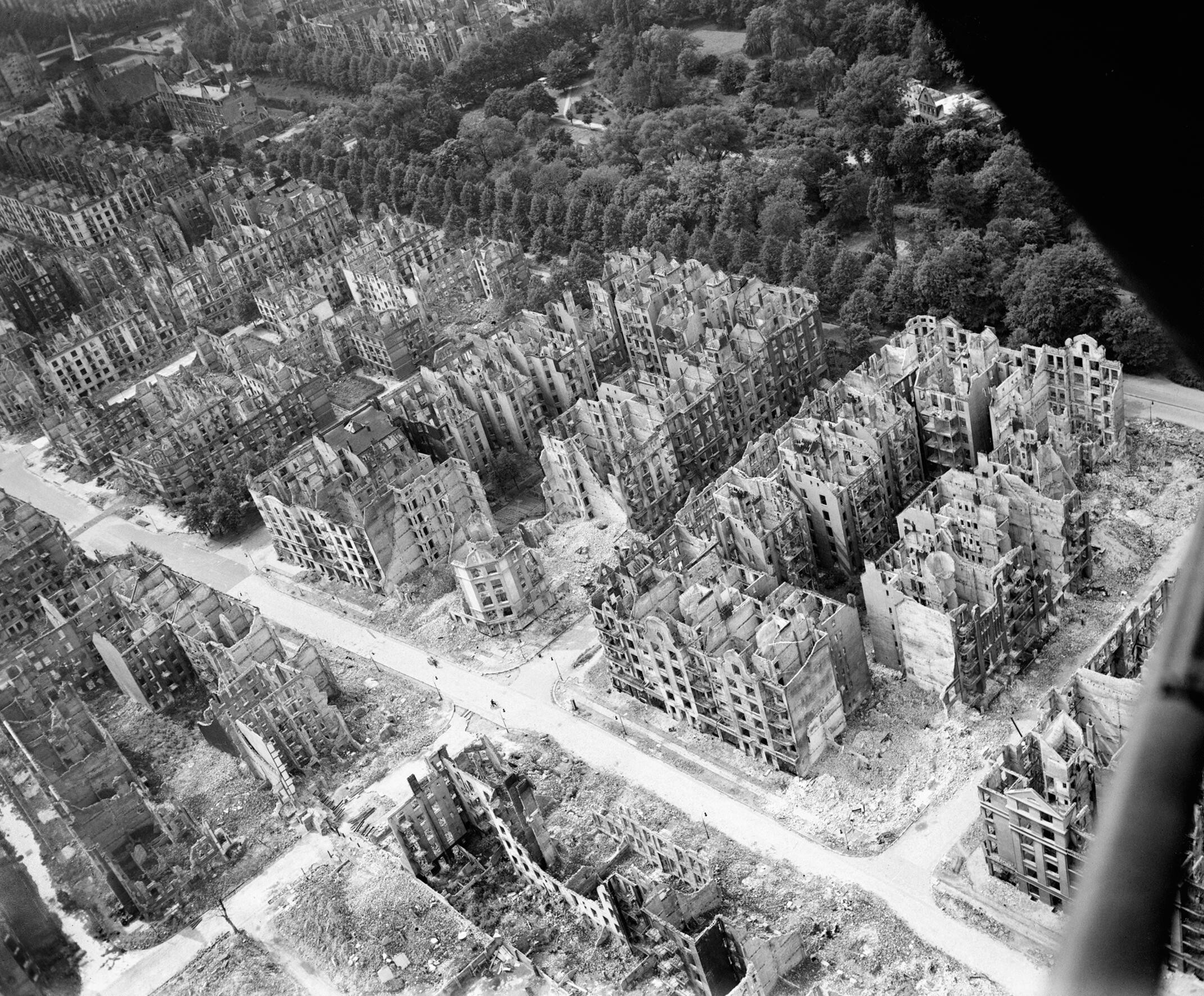
- Aftermath in the Eilbek district of Hamburg. This picture was taken after much of the rubble had been cleared, probably after VE Day.
Date	July 1943 for the major attacks of Operation Gomorrah
Location	Hamburg, Germany 53°33′3″N 9°59′37″E

Belligerents
United Kingdom; United States; Australia; Canada; New Zealand; South Africa	Germany

Casualties and losses
Up to 104 aircraft shot down	Up to 41,000 people killed

The bombing of Hamburg in World War II consisted of a series of Allied air raids on the German city of Hamburg between 1940 and 1945. As a major port and industrial centre, Hamburg was an important target of the Allied strategic bombing campaign. Its shipyards, oil refineries and other industries supported the German war effort. The British Royal Air Force (RAF) also targeted residential areas as part of its policy of area bombing, while the United States Army Air Forces (USAAF) primarily attacked industrial and port facilities.

The most destructive attacks took place during Operation Gomorrah, a series of British and American air raids from 24 July to 3 August 1943. The RAF conducted large-scale night raids, while the USAAF carried out daylight attacks. During the night of 27–28 July, incendiary bombing caused a firestorm that devastated densely populated districts east of the city centre, including Hammerbrook, Hamm and Borgfelde. An estimated 35,000–40,000 people were killed during the operation, and large parts of the city's housing stock were destroyed. Around 900,000 people fled Hamburg in the aftermath of the attacks.

The raids caused extensive damage to Hamburg's industrial facilities, transport networks and other infrastructure, and contributed to changes in German air defences. Allied bombing continued until 1945. Over the course of the war, Hamburg was subjected to 213 air raids, resulting in approximately 41,000 deaths.

== Background ==
=== Political and military pressure ===
RAF Bomber Command had made raids on Germany from the early days of World War II. Initially, only military targets were attacked. Navigation to the target over a blacked-out wartime landscape was extremely poor, as was bombing accuracy - even if the target city (let alone the actual military target) could be found. Consequently bombing operations were very open to criticism as a waste of resources, since such poor results were achieved. The extent of this failure was exposed to the War Cabinet in August 1941 by the Butt Report, which by analysing 600 photographs of raids in the previous three months, found that only a third of crews that claimed to have reached their targets had actually dropped their bombs within five miles (8.0 km) of them.

Opinion on targeting steadily shifted as the war progressed, and by November 1940, the view was developing that the civilian population of Germany was a legitimate target in "total war". By June 1941, RAF thinking had been reversed from seeing any civilian casualties as collateral damage when attacking a military target, to deliberately targeting civilians in an attempt to destroy their morale. This was expected to reduce industrial production and therefore hinder the German war effort. The target was no longer factories, but the people who worked in them and their homes in the surrounding area. This became known as "area bombing". This change was driven not by the inaccuracy of bombing at this stage, but by studying which aspects of the German Blitz on Britain had had most effect. Factories had been seen to be relatively difficult to destroy, but workers needed somewhere to live, and their housing was much more easily made unusable. The absenteeism of de-housed workers was considered to have a bigger effect on industrial production than the level of damage that could be caused, with the same effort, to the factories in which they worked.

Air Marshal Arthur "Bomber" Harris had taken charge of the RAF Bomber Command in February 1942. In the same month, the USAAF 8th Bomber Command set up a headquarters in the United Kingdom ready for the deployment of American units to Britain. Roosevelt was optimistic that bombing had war-winning potential, despite his appeal to Hitler in September 1939 to avoid bombing civilians. Winston Churchill was similarly enthusiastic to bomb Germany. This gave both air forces the political support to deal, at this stage, with criticism of their ineffectiveness.

The build-up of the 8th Bomber Command was slow and though it made some small-scale raids in France during the latter half of 1942, US capability to bomb Germany was not obtained until 1943. The British resources were also limited by competing demands for aircraft. The Western Allies had had to tell the Soviet Union that any idea of opening a second front in Europe in the summer of 1942 was unfeasible. The only thing Churchill had to offer Stalin was a bombing campaign against Germany. This was hard for the RAF to deliver, but it meant that the bombing of Germany could not be abandoned, so Harris would ultimately get the heavy bombers needed. By the time of the big raid on Hamburg at the end of July 1943, both air forces needed a significant success to justify their existence.

=== Firebombing research ===
Britain's experience of being bombed in the Blitz had contributed to the RAF's thinking on how to conduct a bombing campaign. It had become clear that incendiaries could inflict much more damage than high-explosive bombs. Detailed study of this was carried out by the Research and Experiment unit, RE8, (set up in November 1941). The details of how German houses were constructed were examined, and tests were carried out on models to determine how effective an incendiary attack would be. The optimum ratio of high-explosive bombs and incendiaries was calculated. The high explosive was to blow out windows and make firefighting dangerous. High-explosive bombs with delayed-action fuses were included in the mix to further suppress any firefighting effort. The quantity of incendiaries delivered had to be high enough to totally overwhelm any firefighting capability, so that a conflagration could become established.

The Americans took a high level of interest in the British research on the effect of incendiaries. American expertise and experiments by the Standard Oil Development Company and the U.S. Army's Chemical Warfare Service Technical Division added to the planning of fire bombing raids. Despite belief to the contrary, US aircraft also carried a carefully considered mix of high explosive and incendiary bombs. Large quantities of US-made oil-based incendiaries went into service with the 8th Bomber Command shortly before the Hamburg raid – this was preferred by the Americans to the 4 lb (1.8 kg) magnesium-cased thermite bomb used by the British.

The effectiveness of the Hamburg raid relied to a large extent on extensive research into how best to cause a large fire in a German city – as opposed to the popular view that it was an accidental occurrence due to unusual weather conditions.

=== Target selection ===
A number of factors led to Hamburg being chosen for the planned firebombing raid. The construction of the city meant its vulnerability was considered "outstanding". It was Germany's second-largest city. The city's shipbuilding industry made it a priority target. It also had more industrial targets of interest to the Ministry of Economic Warfare than most other German cities. It was reasonably close to the bomber bases in Britain, so giving a short flight with less exposure to anti-aircraft fire and fighters. Hamburg's position close to the coast and on a prominent river made the target easy to find.

== Operation Gomorrah ==
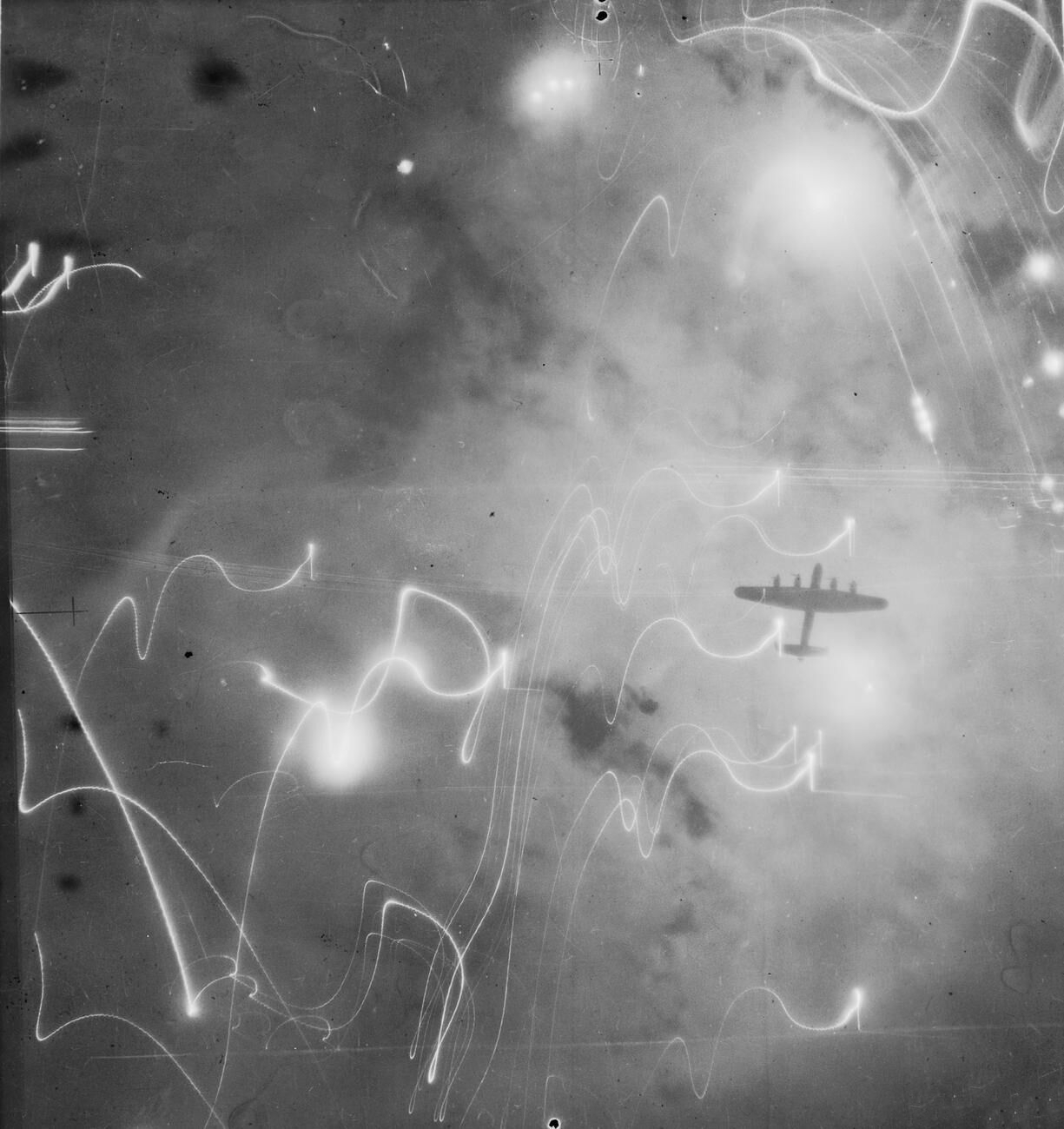
An Avro Lancaster bomber over Hamburg, 30/31 January 1943

Operation Gomorrah, was a campaign of air raids which began on 24 July 1943 and lasted for eight days and seven nights. It was at the time the heaviest assault in the history of aerial warfare. The name Gomorrah comes from that of one of the two Canaanite cities of Sodom and Gomorrah whose destruction is recorded in the Bible.

Before July 1943, RAF Bomber Command's focus had been on the Ruhr industrial region which had been the target of a five-month-long campaign.

Operation Gomorrah was carried out by RAF Bomber Command (including RCAF, RAAF and Polish Squadrons) and the USAAF Eighth Air Force. The British conducted night raids and the USAAF daylight raids.

The initial attack on Hamburg included two new introductions to the British planning: they used "Window", later known as chaff, to confuse the German radar, while the Pathfinder Force aircraft, which normally kept radio silence, reported the winds they encountered, and this information was processed and relayed to the bomber force navigators.

=== First RAF raid 24/25 July ===
The first raid on Hamburg was planned for the night of 23 July, but the raid was delayed by one day because of bad weather. Between 21:45 and 23:00 on 24 July 791 bombers (Note: 73 Vickers Wellingtons, 347 Avro Lancasters, 246 Handley Page Halifaxes, 125 Short Stirlings) took off from their airfields. At 00:57 Pathfinder aircraft, guided only by H2S radar, started to drop yellow target indicators and flares. This was followed by others dropping red target indicators visually by the light of the flares. No. 35 Squadron led the target marking and, thanks to the clear weather and H2S radar, accuracy was good, with markers falling close to the aiming point scattered over five districts. At 01:02 the main force started to bomb; this continued until 01:50 in six waves. Less than half of the bombers dropped their bombs within a 4.8-kilometre (3 mi) radius of the aiming point. Around Hamburg the Germans had lit red decoy fires which caused a hundred bombers to bomb those in error. Still, large areas were set on fire in the five districts marked by the Pathfinders. During the raid a large (9.7-kilometre or 6-mile) creepback developed which saved the city centre from catastrophe but caused other districts to the north to be set on fire as well. While some 40,000 firemen were available to tackle fires, control of their resources was damaged when the telephone exchange caught fire and rubble blocked the passage of fire engines through the city streets; fires were still burning three days later. During the early stages of the raid, some bombs fell on the Blohm and Voss shipyard, where three U-boats were destroyed: U-1011 and U-1012 were hit on their slipways and never repaired, and U-996 sank at the dockside. The local police estimated the number of deaths at 1500.

=== First USAAF raid 25 July ===
A second daylight raid by the USAAF was conducted on 25 July. 323 aircraft attacked Hamburg, Kiel and Warnemünde. 127 aircraft were assigned to bomb the Blohm and Voss shipyard and the Klöckner aero-engine factory in Hamburg. On the outward leg of the raid, the formation was attacked by about 30 German fighters. Only two bombers were lost before reaching the target. 90 out of 127 Boeing B-17 Flying Fortresses reached Hamburg at 16:40. Despite being partly covered in smoke from the previous night bombing, some buildings in the shipyard were hit but the vital U-boat construction slipways were not damaged. The aero-engine factory was completely covered by smoke and secondary targets were bombed instead, including a generating station. Two large liners used as a depot and barracks ship were hit and sunk. German flak damaged 78 aircraft; ten of the damaged bombers that had to leave the formation were finished off by fighters. Over the North Sea on the way back to bases, the formation was attacked by eight night-fighters operating from The Netherlands but they achieved nothing, whilst losing one of their number.

Air reconnaissance on 25 July at 18:30 revealed that Hamburg was still covered in smoke from the previous raids, so another attack by the main force of bomber command on Hamburg for that night was cancelled and instead 705 bombers raided Essen that night. Six De Havilland Mosquitos of No. 139 Squadron RAF Light Night Striking Force (LNSF) carried out a nuisance raid in order to keep the city on a state of alert.

=== Second USAAF raid 26 July ===
On 26 July the USAAF continued its attacks against targets in North-Germany. The same six bombardment groups that had bombed Hamburg the previous day, were ordered to bomb the same targets. The other bombardment groups attacked the Conti rubber plant in Hanover. Due to problems with the formation of the combat boxes and many early returns, only 54 aircraft bombed Hamburg. There was no cloud nor much smoke from burning buildings, but the Germans managed in time to conceal the harbour with artificial smoke. Again secondary targets were bombed: some buildings on the Howaldtswerke-Deutsche Werft U-boat shipyard were hit but no important installations were damaged. The power station in Neuhof was put out of order for one month and deprived Hamburg of 40% of its electricity capacity at a critical moment. All planes bombarded within a minute at 12:00. The German flak managed to damage only two airplanes, which were lost during the homebound journey to England. German fighters concentrated their attacks against the Hanover raid which lost 22 airplanes. The results of the bombing in Hanover were amplified by the fact that most of the firemen were sent as reinforcement to Hamburg.

=== Second RAF raid 27/28 July ===
There was no RAF raid by the main force in the night of 26 July; Bomber Command rarely sent out its main force on three consecutive nights. Six Mosquitos of No. 139 Squadron RAF carried out a nuisance strike.

On the night of 27 July, shortly before midnight, 787 RAF aircraft – 74 Vickers Wellingtons, 116 Short Stirlings, 244 Handley Page Halifaxes and 353 Avro Lancasters – bombed Hamburg. The aiming points were the dense housing of the working-class districts of Billwerder, Borgfelde, Hamm, Hammerbrook, Hohenfelde and Rothenburgsort. The unusually dry and warm weather, the concentration of the bombing in one area and firefighting limitations due to blockbuster bombs used in the early part of the raid – and the recall of Hanover's firecrews to their own city – culminated in a firestorm. The tornadic fire created a huge inferno with winds of up to 240 km/h (150 mph) reaching temperatures of 800 °C (1,470 °F) and up to altitudes in excess of 300 metres (1,000 ft), incinerating more than 21 square kilometres (8 mi^{2}) of the city. Asphalt streets appeared to burst into flame (in fact, it was the phosphorus from the fire bombs that was burning), and fuel oil from damaged and destroyed ships, barges and storage tanks spilled into the water of the canals and the harbour, causing them to ignite as well.

An estimated 18,474 people died on this night. A large number of those killed were seeking safety in air raid shelters and cellars. The firestorm consumed the oxygen in the burning city above and the carbon monoxide poisoned those sheltering below. The furious winds created by the firestorm had the power to sweep people up off the streets like dry leaves. Ten square kilometres (4 sq mi) of the city's center were ablaze just 30 minutes after the start of the firestorm.

=== Third RAF raid 29/30 July ===
Hamburg was only attacked in the night of 28 July by four Mosquitos executing a nuisance raid, a raid by the main force was impossible because of the smoke of the previous bombardment which would hide target indicators. On 29 July a photo reconnaissance Spitfire from No. 542 Squadron RAF reported good weather and no problems with smoke so a third RAF raid was ordered. 777 bombers took off, of which 707 reached Hamburg. There were still fires burning which made visual marking possible, but still the Pathfinders used H2S radar to execute their markings. The Pathfinders missed the aiming point by 3.2 kilometres (2 mi) and marked a district south of the region destroyed in the previous raid. Bombers flew in from the north and because a creepback of 6.4 kilometres (4 mi) developed, the districts Barmbek and Wandsbek were very hard hit. Small fires developed easily into large fires as by this time the firefighting effort had collapsed because of the earlier raids. The Germans did not record specific data for this raid, the number of victims is unknown but on this night 370 people died by carbon monoxide poisoning in a large public shelter.

=== Fourth RAF raid 2/3 August ===
On 30 July Bomber Command was ordered to attack towns in Italy. These raids were cancelled the same day, but too late to mount a raid to Hamburg. A planned raid on 31 July was cancelled due to thunderstorms over the UK.

Because of bad weather, the next attack on Hamburg was delayed until 2 August. Despite weather reconnaissance reports about possible storms close to Hamburg, 737 bombers took off. Five bombers were shot down by night fighters over the North Sea. Just before reaching the German coast, the bomber stream met a severe storm which forced many aircraft to abort or to bomb alternative targets. Cuxhaven, Bremerhaven, Bremen, Wilhelmshaven, Heligoland and other towns as far as 160 kilometres (100 mi) away from Hamburg reported bombs. At least four bombers crashed because of the storm. Only 400 bombers reached Hamburg but as the Pathfinders could not execute an effective marking, most of the bombs fell scattered over the city and its environs. During this raid, the Germans further developed tactics to counter the effects of "Window": a running commentary was broadcasting all available data about the bomber stream. Some night fighters operated independently from ground radar guidance and used this information to search for targets. This tactic would later be further developed into what became known as Zahme Sau. Five bombers were shot down by night fighters over the North Sea, eight were destroyed around Hamburg and a further eleven were lost on the homebound journey. Because of the storm, the bomber stream became less concentrated and some bombers lost the protection of "Window" and fell victim to night fighters operating in the Kammhuber Line.

== Overview Operation Gomorrah ==
Approximately 3,000 sorties were flown, 9,000 tons of bombs were dropped and over 250,000 homes and houses were destroyed.

Hamburg bombing data
Date	Sorties	Bombed	LT	Losses	Casualties
24/25 July	791	728	2,284	12	1,500
25 July	123	90	186	15	20
26 July	121	54	120	2	150
27/28 July	787	729	2,326	17	40,000
29/30 July	777	707	2,318	28	—
2/3 August	740	393	1,416	30	—

== Casualties ==
The death toll from Operation Gomorrah will always be uncertain, but the most accepted single number is now 37,000. If a range is stated, this is generally between 34,000 (from police records) and 40,000 (a commonly used figure in Germany before the end of the war). Most of the dead were unidentified. By 1 December 1943, there were 31,647 confirmed dead, but of these only 15,802 were based on the identification of a body. In some cases, the numbers of people who had perished in cellars converted into "air protection rooms" could only be estimated from the quantity of ash left on the floor. Those who died represented about 2.4% of the total population of Hamburg at the time.

== Other effects ==
In the first week after the raid, about one million people evacuated the city. 61% of the housing stock was destroyed or damaged. The city's labour force was reduced by ten percent. No subsequent city raid shook Germany as did that on Hamburg; documents show that German officials were thoroughly alarmed and there is some indication from later Allied interrogations of Nazi officials that Hitler stated that further raids of similar weight would force Germany out of the war. The industrial losses were severe: Hamburg never recovered to full production, only doing so in essential armaments industries (in which maximum effort was made). Figures given by German sources indicate that 183 large factories were destroyed out of 524 in the city and 4,118 smaller factories out of 9,068 were destroyed.

Other losses included damage to or destruction of 580 industrial concerns and armaments works, 299 of which were important enough to be listed by name. Local transport systems were completely disrupted and did not return to normal for some time. Dwellings destroyed amounted to 214,350 out of 414,500. Hamburg was hit by air raids another 69 times before the end of World War II. In total, the RAF dropped 22,940 tonnes (22,580 long tons) of bombs on Hamburg.

=== Military consequences ===
The huge amount of damage to Hamburg precipitated a number of large changes to German air defence systems. Priority was given to fighter production. Research was intensified for more effective radar technology. Both aircraft and guns were diverted away from the front line to defend Germany. By August of 1943, 45% of all German fighters were now located on the home front, with additional units in northern France. At the same time, heavy anti-aircraft guns in Germany were increased by over 25 per cent.

The reallocation of much of the industrial war production of Germany to home defence was an unintended consequence of Operation Gomorrah. The fighting fronts suffered due to a lack of air support as resources were devoted to fighter aircraft back in the Reich. Anti-aircraft units in Germany made greatly increased demands for personnel and, later in the war, used 25% of all ammunition. It can therefore be argued that the military results of the overall bombing campaign were greater than the effects on the German economy or German morale.

=== Contemporary press reports ===
There was press coverage of the Hamburg raids as they were taking place, with for instance both The Times of London and The New York Times running stories on 26 July 1943, after the raids had commenced but a day before the firestorm raid took place, that emphasized the large size and coordinated British-American nature of the bombing campaign against the city.

This American propaganda film footage covers the Eighth Air Force's bombing of Hamburg. The bombing caused large-scale destruction of the city's residential areas.

The destruction of Hamburg became a major news story at the time and caused a great impression as to the extent of the damage and loss of life. By 3 August 1943, just as the raids were concluding, military expert George Fielding Eliot was analyzing the subject at length in his syndicated column published in US newspapers. Newspaper editorials and cartoons also referred to the complete destruction of Hamburg. A report from the Newspaper Enterprise Association's London correspondent on 9 August speculated on how quickly Berlin could "be eliminated" in the same fashion. At the same time in Germany itself, the Hamburg raids were seen as a far worse development than major German military reverses then taking place on the Eastern Front and in Sicily and Italy.

Initial eyewitness accounts by foreign nationals who had been in Hamburg did not attempt to give numerical figures for the destruction, instead describing it as beyond belief. As one 9 August 1943 United Press story about a Swiss merchant's account related, it was a "hell released" by a "devil's concert" that amounted to "Hamburg's ceaseless, inescapable destruction on a scale that defies the imagination." Even the German press, which had previously downplayed or not discussed bombings of German cities, here emphasized the effects on Hamburg and the numbers of refugees coming from there. Later in August, New York Times foreign correspondent C. L. Sulzberger relayed a German belief that there had been 200,000 deaths, which he viewed as credible. By November 1943, a Swiss dispatch to Swedish newspapers gave a figure of 152,000 killed in the Hamburg bombing, but without supplying an explanation for the source of the number.

Just a few months after the European war's conclusion, newspaper accounts described the findings of the United States Strategic Bombing Survey (USSBS), publicly released on 30 October 1945, which gave the German estimates of 60,000–100,000 deaths in the Hamburg bombings. And even higher numbers sometimes were still used. During the 1949–50 debate within the U.S. government about whether to proceed with development of the hydrogen bomb, arguments based on morality were made against developing a weapon whose main utility seemed to be killing massive numbers of civilians with one detonation. Objecting to this line of reasoning, Senator Brien McMahon, chairman of the United States Congressional Joint Committee on Atomic Energy, wrote a letter to President Harry S. Truman in which he asked, "Where is the valid ethical distinction between the several Hamburg raids that produced 135,000 fatalities," the March 1945 firebombing of Tokyo, the atomic bombing of Hiroshima, and the proposed thermonuclear weapon. McMahon concluded that "There is no moral dividing line that I can see" between any of these.

== Aftermath ==
=== Cityscape ===
The totally-destroyed quarter of Hammerbrook, in which mostly port workers lived, was rebuilt not as a housing area but as a commercial area. The adjoining quarter of Rothenburgsort shared the same fate since only a small area of housing was rebuilt. The underground line that connected both areas with the central station was not rebuilt either.

In the destroyed residential areas, many houses were rebuilt across the street and so no longer form connected blocks. The hills of the Öjendorfer Park are formed by the debris of destroyed houses.

In January 1946, Major Cortez F. Enloe, a surgeon in the USAAF who worked on the USSBS, said that the fire effects of the atomic bomb dropped on Nagasaki "were not nearly as bad as the effects of the R.A.F. raids on Hamburg on July 27th 1943". He estimated that more than 40,000 people died in Hamburg.

Albert Speer, the then German armaments minister, later said, in a 1977 interview:

It was quite a surprise to us when the first Hamburg raid took place because you used some new device [chaff] which was preventing the anti-aircraft guns to find your bombers, so you had a great success and you repeated these attacks on Hamburg several times and each time the new success was greater and the depression was larger, and I have said, in those days, in a meeting of the Air Ministry, that if you would repeat this success on four or five other German towns, then we would collapse.

— Albert Speer, The Secret War

=== Memorials ===
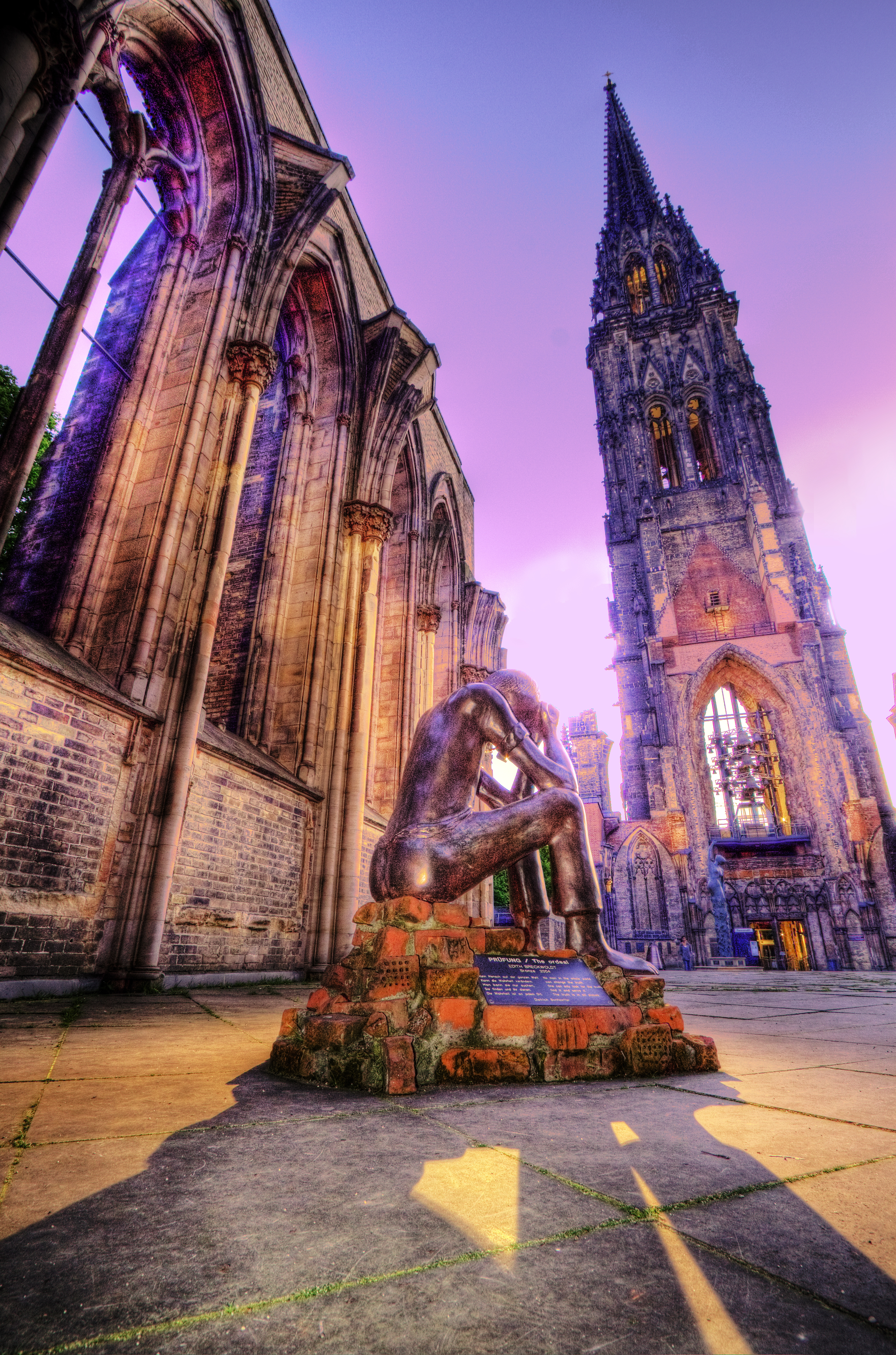
Sculpture at the main memorial in the ruins of the Nikolaikirche

Several memorials in Hamburg are reminders of the air raids of World War II:

- The ruins of the Nikolaikirche ('St Nicholas Church'), which was largely destroyed during the bombing, have been made into a memorial against war. The spire of the church survived the attacks.
- Memorial at the Hamburger Strasse for those who died in a shelter under the Karstadt department store at the corner of Desenißstrasse and Hamburger Strasse. The department store was hit by a bomb on the night of 29 July. The people in the air raid shelter below were killed by the heat and carbon monoxide poisoning.
- The victims of the air raids were buried on the Ohlsdorf Cemetery in mass graves. The memorial "Passage over the Styx" by Gerhard Marcks is in the centre and shows how Charon ferries a young couple, a mother with her child, a man and a person who is despairing over the river Styx.
- Many houses rebuilt after World War II have a memorial plaque with the inscription "Destroyed 1943 – 19** Rebuilt," as a reminder of their destruction during the air raids of July 1943.

== Timeline ==
Raids on Hamburg during Second World War
Date	Target/Type	Roundel and notes
night of 10/11 September 1939	leaflets	10 RAF aircraft.
night 17/18 May 1940	oil installations	48 Hampdens attacked Hamburg oil installations.
night 27/28 May 1940	oil refineries	Hampdens attacked oil refineries near Hamburg.
night 30/31 May 1940	oil refineries	Hamburg oil refineries were bombed.
June–October 1940		Hamburg, Wilhelmshaven and Münster were frequent targets during the Battle of Britain (June–October 1940) but lack of bombing accuracy meant that little damage was done, (See Butt Report (August 1941)).
night 20/21 October 1940		Hamburg bombed by Wellingtons which started 12 fires with little loss of life.
night 24/25 October 1940		Hamburg bombed by Wellingtons which started 13 fires with little loss of life.
nights of 15/16 November and 16/17 November 1940		over 200 aircraft. On the first night damage was caused to the Blohm & Voss shipyard and over 60 fires were started. On the second night only 60 aircraft found their target and damage was far less. (Note: These two nights of bombing were only 24 hours after a very large raid by the German Luftwaffe on Coventry on the night of 14/15 November 1940. The raid must have been planned more than 24 hours in advance, so although these raids are often stated to be revenge attacks, it is unlikely that they were planned to be so.)
night of 12/13 March 1941		Hamburg, Bremen, and Berlin bombed by a total of 257
The night of 13/14 March 1941		51 people were killed, the highest number in a single raid to date
April 1941		During this month Hamburg was a main target.
May 1941		Hamburg was bombed several times during the month. Raids now usually contained about 100 bombers.
The night of 11/12 May 1941		92 aircraft.
The night of 27/28 June 1941		a raid on Bremen but most bombed Hamburg – an error of 50 miles (80 km); 11 out of 35 bombers were shot down by night fighters.
night of 14/15 January 1942		95 aircraft. Only 48 aircraft claimed to have bombed Hamburg. Altona station was hit and 12 fires, 7 of them large ones, were started. Six people killed and 22 injured. No aircraft reported lost.
night of 15/16 January 1942		96 aircraft. 52 bombers claimed to have bombed Hamburg successfully. 36 fires started 3 of which were large, 3 people killed and 25 injured. 11 Bombers lost.
night of 17/18 January 1942		Bremen was the main target for 83 aircraft, but Hamburg was bombed as a secondary target causing 11 fires and casualties of 5 dead and 12 injured in Hamburg. Four bombers lost.
night of 16/17 February 1942		one or two bombers.
night of 8/9 April 1942		largest raid to date on a single target. Carried out by 272 aircraft. Raid was considered a failure. 17 people were killed and 119 injured. 5 planes lost.
The night of 17/18 April 1942		173 aircraft. 75 fires, 33 classed as large were started. Twenty-three people were killed and 66 injured. Eight aircraft lost.
The night of 3/4 May 1942		81 aircraft, dispatched on the 100th anniversary of a great fire in Hamburg. 53 aircraft were estimated to have hit the target. 113 fires started, of which 57 were large. 77 were killed, 243 injured and 1,624 bombed out. 5 aircraft were lost.
night of 26/27 July 1942		403 aircraft. Widespread damage was caused, mostly in housing and semi-commercial districts rather than in the docks and industrial areas. At least 800 fires started, 523 of which were large. 823 houses were destroyed and more than 5,000 damaged. More than 14,000 people were bombed out. 337 people were killed and 1,027 injured. 29 aircraft were lost, 7.2% of the force.
night of 28/29 July 1942		256 aircraft. Due to bad weather only 68 bombed in the target area. Fifty-six fires, 15 of them large, were started. Thirteen people were killed and 48 injured. Bomber losses were high, 15.3% for the main group bombing that night.
day of 3 August 1942		10 aircraft.
day of 18 August 1942	nuisance raid	single Mosquito.
day of 19 September 1942	nuisance raid	2 Mosquitoes.
night of 13/14 October 1942		light secondary target raid. 2 large fires were started. 8 people were killed and 43 injured.
night of 9/10 November 1942		213 aircraft. There were 26 fires started of which 3 were large. 3 people killed and 16 injured. 15 aircraft lost, 7.0% of the force.
night of 30/31 January 1943		148 aircraft. It was the first H2S radar-assisted attack of the war. H2S use was not successful and the bombs were scattered. Of 119 fires set, 71 were large. 58 people were killed and 164 injured. 5 aircraft were lost, 3.4% of the force.
night of 3/4 February 1943		263 aircraft. Bad weather affected the bombers with many turning back early. Damage was light for what was planned to be a large raid. 16 bombers were lost, 6.1% of the force, many to nightfighters.
The night of 3/4 March 1943		417 aircraft. The Pathfinders marked the wrong target, mistaking a mud bank for the docks with their H2S radar, so most of the bombs landed 13 miles (21 km) downstream from the centre of Hamburg, around the small town of Wedel. Those bombs which landed on Hamburg did considerable damage starting 100 fires, killing 27 people and injuring 95. The damage to Wedel was extensive. 10 aircraft lost, 2.4% of the force.
13/14 April 1943	nuisance raid	2 Mosquitoes.
25 June 1943	Blohm & Voss	Mission Number 67: 275 B-17 were to attack submarine pens and industrial areas of Hamburg and Bremen, but the primary targets were obscured by cloud so the bombers hit 167 bomb "targets of opportunity in NW Germany". The 384th Bombardment Group of the USAAF were involved in the attack of an initial 19 aircraft, 11 aborted the mission and only 5 joined the combat wing.
night of 26/27 June 1943	nuisance raid	4 Mosquitoes.
night of 28/29 June 1943	nuisance raid	4 Mosquitoes.
night of 3/4 July 1943	nuisance raid	4 Mosquitoes.
night of 5/6 July 1943	nuisance raid	4 Mosquitoes.
night of 24/25 July 1943	large raid	791 aircraft marked the opening of the "Battle of Hamburg" or so called "Operation Gomorrah raid". A countermeasure against the radar-directed German nightfighters in the form of "Window" was used for the first time. In the clear weather visual and H2S marking was accurate and on the town centre. 728 aircraft dropped their bombs in 50 minutes. Less than half the force bombed within three miles (4.8 km) of the centre with a bomb creepback of six miles (9.7 km). Damage was caused in the central and north-western districts, particularly in Altona, Eimsbüttel and Hoheluft. The Rathaus (Town Hall), the St. Nikolai church, the main police station, the main telephone exchange and the Hagenbeck Zoo were among the well-known landmarks to be hit. About 1,500 people were killed which was the largest outside the range of the "Oboe" radio navigation system which helped to concentrate the bombing pattern. Thanks to the use of Window only 12 aircraft were lost, 1.5% of the force.
25 July 1943	Blohm and Voss shipyard Klöckner aero-engine factory	Mission Number 76. It is planned that 127 B-17 will bomb two targets at Hamburg but due to smoke, only 90 planes from the 91st, 351st, 381st, 303rd, 379th, 384th bomb group ( six out of nine bomb groups of the 1st Bombardment Wing) bomb secondary targets in a 15-minute period starting at 16:30. 15 B-17s were lost, and American casualties were one killed, five wounded and 150 missing.
26 July 1943	Blohm and Voss shipyard Klöckner aero-engine factory	Mission Number 77. 121 B-17s dispatched against Hanover (54) and the U-boat yards at Hamburg between 11:59 and 12:00 (71).
The night of 26/27 July 1943	nuisance raid	6 Mosquitoes attacked Hamburg.
night of 27/28 July 1943	Large raid	787 aircraft guided in by Pathfinders using H2S bombed about two miles (3.2 km) east of city centre. A firestorm was created in the built-up working-class districts of Hammerbrook, Hamm, Borgfelde and Rothenburgsort. The bombing was more concentrated than the RAF was usually able to manage at this stage of the war. In just over half an hour it is estimated that 550–600 bomb loads fell into an area measuring only two by one mile (3.2 by 1.6 km) and this gradually spread the fire eastward. The firestorm lasted for about three hours, consuming approximately 16,000 multi-storeyed apartment buildings and killing an estimated 40,000 people, most of them by carbon monoxide poisoning when all the air was drawn out of their basement shelters. Fearing further raids, two-thirds of Hamburg's population, approximately 1,200,000 people, fled the city in the aftermath.
night of 28/29 July 1943	nuisance raid	4 Mosquitoes.
night of 29/30 July 1943	Large raid	777 aircraft guided in by pathfinders marking using H2S. The plan was to bomb the untouched northern suburbs. But a mistake in mapping led to the bombing of an area just north of the area devastated by the firestorm three nights before. The residential areas of Wandsbek and Barmbek districts and parts of the Uhlenhorst and Winterhude were severely damaged and widespread fires but no firestorm. Twenty-eight aircraft 3.6% of the force was lost.
night of 2/3 August 1943		740 aircraft dispatched on a raid to Hamburg but bad weather stopped all but a few bombers reaching Hamburg; many bombed secondary targets instead. 30 aircraft, 4.1% of the force was lost.
night of 22/23 August 1943	nuisance raid	6 Mosquitoes.
night of 5/6 November 1943		Hamburg and other cities raided by a total of 26 Mosquitoes.
night of 1/2 January 1944	diversionary raid (Berlin)	15 Mosquitoes attacked Hamburg.
night of 11/12 March 1944	nuisance raid	20 Mosquitoes.
night of 6/7 April 1944		35 Mosquitoes.
night of 26/27 April 1944	diversionary raid	16 Mosquitoes.
night of 28/29 April 1944		26 Mosquitoes.
18 June 1944	oil refineries	Mission 421: B-17s bombed Hamburg-Ebano (18), Hamburg-Eurotank (54), Hamburg-Ossag (38), and Hamburg-Schindler (36).
20 June 1944	oil refineries	Mission 425: B-17s bombed oil refineries at Hamburg/Deut.Petr.AG (53), Harburg/Ebano (60),Hamburg/Eurotank (107), Hamburg/Rhenania-Ossag (50), Harburg/Rhenania (53), Hamburg/Schliemanns (54), and Hamburg/Schindler (26).
night of 22/23 June 1944	diversionary raid	29 Mosquitoes.
night of 22/23 July 1944	diversionary raid	26 Mosquitoes.
night of 26/27 July 1944	diversionary raid	30 Mosquitoes.
night of 29/29 July 1944		307 aircraft. The raid was not a success, the bombing was scattered and German sources estimated that only 120 bombers landed their load on the city. 22 aircraft were lost mainly to night fighters.
4 August 1944	oil refineries	Mission 514: 181 B-17s bombed Hamburg refineries.
6 August 1944	oil refineries	Mission 524: Hamburg oil refineries bombed at Hamburg/Deutsche (54), Hamburg/Eband [sic] (33), Hamburg/Rhenania (61), Hamburg/Rhenania-Ossag (62), Hamburg/Schlieman (32), and Hamburg/Schulau (72 B-17s). Rhenania-Ossag was a subsidiary of Royal Dutch Shell.
night of 26/27 August 1944	diversionary nuisance raid	13 Mosquitoes.
night of 29/30 August 1944	diversionary nuisance raid	Hamburg was one of five cities bombed by a total of 53 Mosquitoes.
night of 6/7 September 1944	nuisance raid	32 Mosquitoes.
night of 26/27 September 1944	diversionary nuisance raid	6 Mosquitoes.
night of 30/1 October 1944		46 Mosquitoes.
6 October 1944	oil refinery (Harburg/Rhenania)	Mission 667: 121 of 406 dispatched B-24s bombed the Harburg/Rhenania oil refinery.
night of 12/13 October 1944		52 Mosquitoes.
25 October 1944	oil refineries	Mission 688: 455 B-17s dispatched to hit the Harburg (221, including those of the 447th BG) and Rhenania oil refineries (214) at Hamburg. 297 B-17s dispatched to hit the primary hit secondaries, Harburg (179) and Rhenania oil refineries (106) at Hamburg; cloud cover limited accuracy, devastation of Harburg city
30 October 1944	oil refineries	Mission 693: 357 B-24s were dispatched to hit the Harburg oil refinery (72) and Rhenania oil refinery (67) at Hamburg, 28 bomb Hamburg targets of opportunity.
4 November 1944	oil refinery	Mission 700: 257 B-17s were dispatched to hit the Harburg oil plant at Hamburg (238), 186 of 193 B-17s hit the Rhenania oil plant at Hamburg.
5 November 1944	ordnance depots	US Ninth (Tactical) Air Force: send 160 B-26s and A-20s to attack ammunition, ordnance, and supply depots in Hamburg.
6 November 1944	oil refineries	Mission 704: 291 B-17s were dispatched to hit the Harburg (142) and Rhenania (138) oil refineries at Hamburg.
night of 11/12 November 1944	oil refineries	237 Lancasters and 8 Mosquitoes of No 5 Group were dispatched to hit the Rhenania-Ossag oil refinery Harburg, which had been attacked several times by American day bombers.
21 November 1944	oil refineries	Mission 720: 366 B-24s were sent to hit the Dpag (178) and Rhenania (171) oil plants at Hamburg.(cloud cover limited accuracy, devastigation of Harburg city)
night of 30/1 December 1944	diversionary raid	53 Mosquitoes.
night of 11/12 December 1944		28 Mosquitoes.
night of 27/28 December 1944	nuisance raid	7 Mosquitoes hit Hamburg-Wandsbek and -Barmbek at 3 am.
31 December 1944	Blohm & Voss	Mission 772: 526 B-17s were dispatched to hit oil industry targets at Hamburg (68), the Wilhelmsburg refinery at Harburg (92), the Grassbrook refinery at Hamburg (71) and the industrial area at Hamburg (72).
night of 16/17 January 1945	diversionary nuisance raid	9 Mosquitoes.
24 February 1945	Blohm & Voss	The 384 BG bombed the Hamburg submarine yards.
24 February 1945	oil refineries	Mission 845: 362 B-17s were sent to hit the Albrecht 278 and Harburg 70 oil refineries at Hamburg.
5 March 1945	oil refinery	Mission 865: 120 of 126 B-24s hit the Harburg oil refinery at Hamburg without loss.
8/9 March 1945	Blohm & Voss	312 aircraft, including those of the No. 466 Squadron RAAF, bombed Blohm & Voss to destroy the type XXI U-boats (cloud cover limited accuracy).
10 March 1945	Blohm & Voss	The No. 466 Squadron RAAF bombed Blohm & Voss.
11 March 1945	oil refinery	Mission 881: 469 of 485 B-17s bomb the Wilhelmsburg oil refinery at Hamburg; one other hits a target of opportunity; one B-17 was lost and 41 damaged; three airmen were wounded and 10 were missing in action.
20 March 1945	shipyards, docs and oil installations	Mission 898: 451 bombers and 355 fighters were dispatched to bomb the shipyard and dock area at Hamburg and an oil refinery. All the targets were bombed including the Blohm & Voss U-boat yard.
night of 21/22 March 1945	oil refinery (Erdölwerke)	159 aircraft put the refinery out of action for the rest of the war.
30 March 1945	oil depot	Mission 918: 530 B-17s were sent to bomb 2 U-boat yards oil depot at Hamburg. 64 bomb the yards and 169 the depot. 263 bomb the port area at Hamburg (the secondary target) and one bombs Bremen (a target of opportunity). Bombing was both visual and using H2X radar.
night of 30/31 March 1945		raid by 43 Mosquitoes.
day of 31 March 1945	Blohm & Voss	469 aircraft to destroy the Type XXI U-boats under construction. Cloud cover prevented serious damage to the target, but there was considerable damage to houses, factories, energy supplies and communications over a wide area of southern Hamburg. 11 aircraft lost mainly to German day fighters.
night of 2/3 April 1945	nuisance raid	1 Mosquito.
8 April 1945	U-boat yard	A 'Disney' mission: 22 of 24 B-17s bomb the Finkenwarder U-boat yard at Hamburg without loss.
night of 8/9 April 1945	shipyard	440 aircraft – partial cloud caused the raid to become dispersed. There was some damage to the yards but it was not clear whether the damage was American or British or both.
day of 9 April 1945	oil storage	57 Lancasters of No. 5 Group RAF attacked oil-storage tanks (40 aircraft) and U-boat shelters (17 aircraft of No. 617 "Dambuster" Squadron with Grand Slam and Tallboy bombs). Both attacks were successful. 2 Lancasters were lost from the raid on the oil tanks.
night of 9/10 April 1945	diversionary raid	24 Mosquitoes.
The night of 13/14 April 1945	diversionary raid	87 Mosquitoes.
