= Kaiserliche Werften =

Kaiserliche Werften were government-owned shipyards which were responsible for the construction and repair of warships of the Prussian Navy from 1871 to 1920. They were also responsible for the design and construction of a small number of aircraft for the German navy during World War I.

There were four Kaiserliche Werften:

- Kaiserliche Werft Danzig
- Kaiserliche Werft Kiel
- Kaiserliche Werft Wilhelmshaven
- Kaiserliche Werft Antwerpen in Hoboken (1914–1918)
