= Creepback =

Creepback (or creep-back) is the tendency of bomber aircraft using optical bombsights to release their weapons aimed at target markers before time, leading to a gradual spread backwards along the bombing path of the concentration of bombing. It was a particularly noted phenomenon of the Royal Air Force's Bomber Command night attacks during World War II.

The most dangerous time of a bombing raid in World War II was during the bombing run, the approach to the target. The bomber pilot was required to hold the aircraft straight and level, unable to take evasive action in the face of fierce enemy air defences over the target, including searchlights, night fighters and anti-aircraft fire. The temptation was strong for the bomber crew to 'flinch' and release their bombs slightly before reaching the target indicator flares that marked the aiming point. The fires started by the short bombs tended to be used as an aiming point by subsequent crews, who in turn also dropped their bomb loads slightly short. The result was that "the bombing inevitably crept back along the line of the bomb run."

The problem was further exacerbated by the need to re-mark the target with flares as the original markers were extinguished or hidden by smoke and flame. The marker aircraft were also susceptible to creepback, which accelerated the effect on subsequent waves of bombers.

The RAF could find no effective counter to the problem of Creepback, and eventually incorporated it into their mission planning. The initial aiming point for a bombing raid would be set on the far side of the target as the bomber stream approached, allowing the bombing pattern to 'creep back' across the target, which was usually an industrial or residential district of a city.

Creepback may not have been so pronounced during American day bombing raids, because the large, tightly packed American bomber formations dropped their bombs together when the formation leader's aircraft bombed. In the British bomber stream tactic, by contrast, each aircraft bombed independently while flying at a set height and course.

== See also ==
- Area bombing
- RAF Bomber Command
- Operation Gomorrah
