= List of German companies by employees in 1938 =

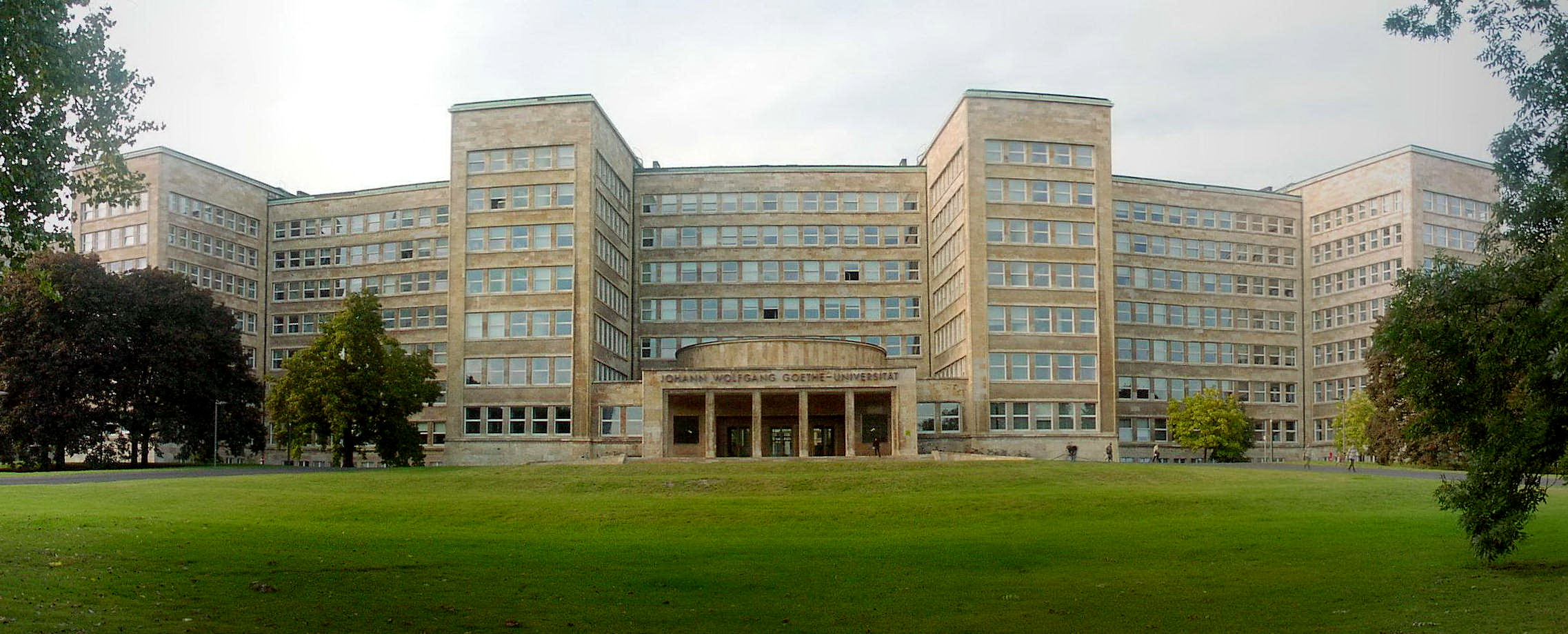
The former corporate headquarters of IG Farben

This is a list of the largest companies of Nazi Germany by employees in 1938.

== Companies by employees ==
The list is based on Fiedler (1999a, 1999b), who compiled data from a variety of sources. Given the shortage of historical employment data some employment numbers are only estimates and some companies might be missing from this list. Employment numbers are including all subsidiaries as long as the parent company is the majority shareholder, that is, holds more than 50 percent of the stock. An exception is Telefunken, which is included in the list as it was a joint venture of Siemens and Allgemeine Elektricitäts-Gesellschaft which each company holding 50 percent of the shares of Telefunken. Employee numbers are not including those employed in foreign subsidiaries. The only three companies in 1938 with large foreign subsidiaries were Siemens with 11.2 percent of the workforce employed abroad, Allgemeine Elektrizitäts-Gesellschaft with less than 20 percent and Mannesmann with 10 percent. In 1938 seven of the 100 largest German companies were subsidiaries of foreign companies, all of them included in the list. The seven foreign-controlled companies were the subsidiaries of Luxembourgish Arbed (Felten & Guilleaume, Eschweiler Bergwerksverein and Burbacher Hütte), American General Motors (Adam Opel), American International Telephone & Telegraph (Deutsche I.T.& T.-Gruppe), American Singer Corporation (Singer Nähmaschinen), French de Wendel group (de Wendelsche Berg-und Hüttenwerke), Belgian Solvay (Deutsche Solvay) and Dutch-British Royal Dutch Shell (Rhenania Ossag Mineralölwerke).

Rank	Company	Employees	Industry
1.	Deutsche Reichsbahn	703,546	Railway
2.	Deutsche Reichspost	397,890	Postal administration
3.	I.G. Farbenindustrie	218,000	Chemicals
4.	Vereinigte Stahlwerke	197,000	Mining and steel
5.	Siemens (Siemens & Halske and Siemens-Schuckert)	165,975	Electrical engineering
6.	Friedrich Krupp	123,408	Mining and steel
7.	Gutehoffnungshütte	75,781	Mining and steel
8.	Vereinigte Elektrizitäts- und Bergwerks Aktiengesellschaft	72,345	Mining and utilities
9.	Friedrich Flick KG	71,408	Steel
10.	Allgemeine Elektrizitäts-Gesellschaft	65,000	Electrical engineering
11.	Reichswerke Hermann Göring	63,000	Mining and steel
12.	Saargruben AG	48,448	Mining
13.	Daimler-Benz	47,095	Vehicles
14.	Junkers Flugzeug-und Motorenwerke	44,015	Aircraft
15.	Klöckner-Werke	43,409	Steel and mechanical engineering
16.	Mannesmannröhrenwerke	43,000	Steel
17.	Metallgesellschaft	41,000	Metals
18.	Otto Wolff-Konzern	33,000	Steel
19.	Arbed	32,000	Steel
20.	Salzdetfurth AG	31,131	Mining
21.	Hoesch	30,993	Steel
22.	Adam Opel	27,000	Vehicles
23.	Schering	26,665	Pharmaceuticals
24.	Vereinigte Industrieunternehmungen AG	25,000	Metals, mining and utilities
25.	Robert Bosch GmbH	23,233	Electrical engineering
26.	Auto Union	22,673	Vehicles
27.	Deutsche I.T.& T.-Gruppe	21,000	Electrical engineering
28.	Deutsche Schiff- und Maschinenbau AG	21,000	Shipbuilding and aircraft
29.	Philipp Holzmann	20,800	Construction
30.	Hochtief	20,425	Construction
31.	Rudolph Karstadt	20,000	Retail
32.	Deutsche Erdöl AG	20,000	Oil
33.	Deutsche Werke Kiel	20,000	Shipbuilding
34.	Hugo Schneider AG	19,200	Arms and ammunition
35.	Deutsche Reichsbank	18,931	Banking
36.	Christian Dierig	18,834	Textiles
37.	Zellstofffabrik Waldhof	18,402	Paper
38.	Ernst Heinkel Flugzeugwerke	18,297	Aircraft
39.	Rheinisch-Westfälisches Elektrizitätswerk	17,754	Utilities
40.	Deutsche Bank	17,462	Banking
41.	Deutsche Continental-Gas-Gesellschaft	17,400	Utilities
42.	Bayerische Motoren-Werke	16,968	Vehicles
43.	Continental Gummi-Werke	16,606	Rubber

== See also ==
- Economic history of Germany
- Economy of Nazi Germany
- List of companies by employees
- List of German companies by employees in 1907
