= INTRIA (Nazi Germany) =

Agency in the Ministry of Economics in Nazi Germany

INTRIA is the acroymn for the International Trade and Investment Agency. It was an agency in the Ministry of Economics during Nazi Germany prior to and during World War II and responsible for transferring funds in connection to German Jews.

INTRIA was established in March 1936, as a bank in London, whose managing director was Siegfried Moses, a German Zionist. This bank placed orders for German goods in Germany; then paid for them out of the funds paid into it by emigrants. The goods were then sold outside Germany, and the emigrant received his money back in foreign currency from INTRIA when he arrived in his country of destination. This process continued even after the start of World War II. The principle was the same as with Haavara Agreement, and really amounted to saving Jewish capital at the price of promoting German exports, albeit with no foreign currency accruing to the Germans. The organisation also helped raise money in other countries that was donated to Jewish communities in Palestine. According to one source, INTRIA raised nearly $900,000 for German Jews living in Palestine.
