= Mauterndorf Castle =

Castle in Salzburg, Austria

Coordinates: 47°08′15″N 13°40′42″E

Mauterndorf Castle Burg Mauterndorf
- Salzburg, Austria
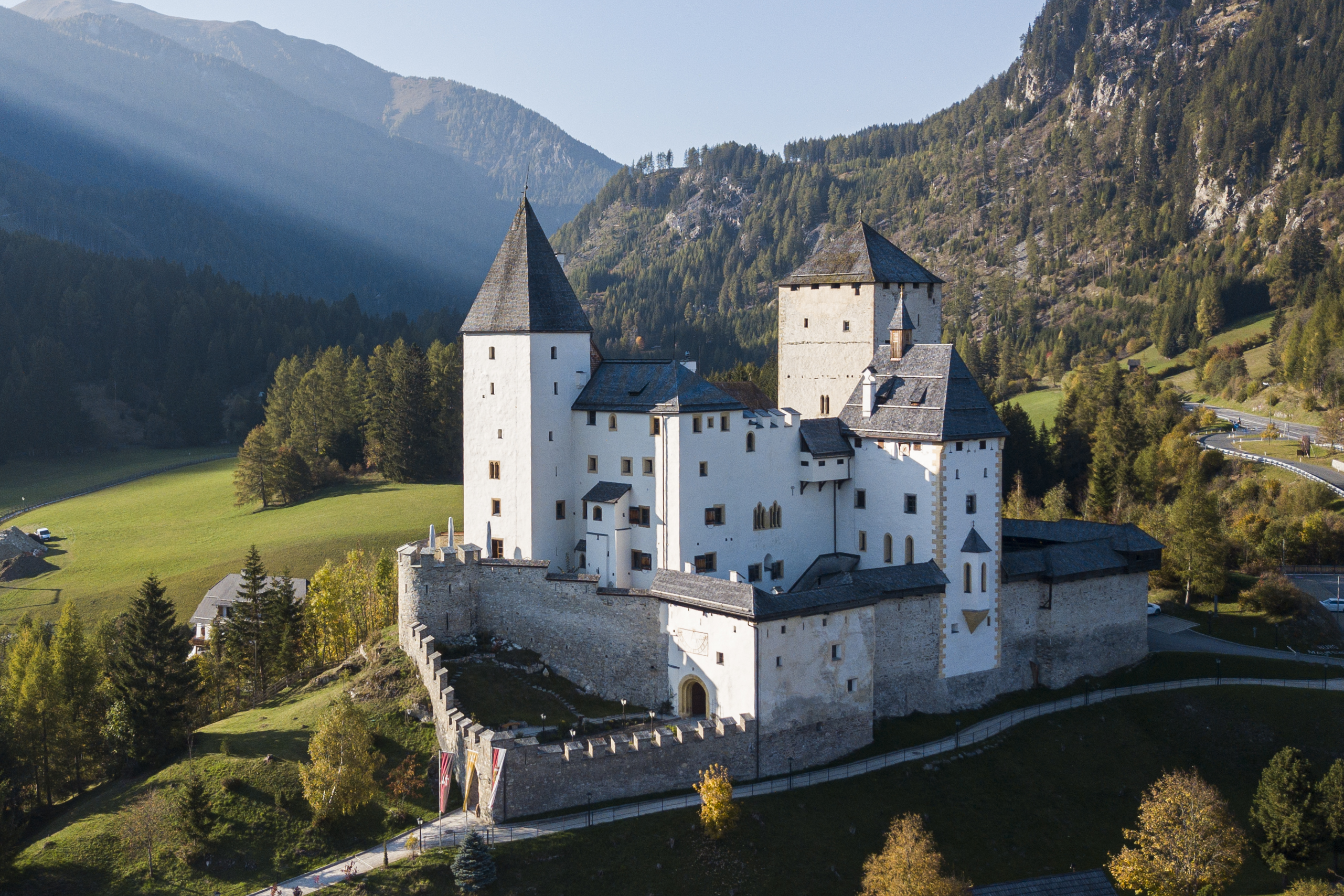

Site information
- Type: Hill castle
- Owner: State of Salzburg
- Open to the public: Yes
- Condition: Preserved

Site history
- Built: about 1253
- Built by: Archbishops of Salzburg

Mauterndorf Castle (German: Burg Mauterndorf) is a castle in the municipality of Mauterndorf, in the Austrian state of Salzburg. It is situated at an altitude of 1,138 metres (3,734 ft).

== History ==
=== Roman fort ===
Mautendorf Castle was probably built on the site of an old Roman fort that dates to AD 326 or earlier. The fort had protected the Roman mountain road from Teurnia via Radstädter Tauern Pass to Iuvavum (present-day Salzburg) and served as a residence for the Roman administrator in the Noricum province. The original fort was destroyed during the Migration Period.

=== Medieval castle ===
A castle built on the site in later years was funded and supported by a toll (German: Maut) collection system for the nearby road. Evidence for this comes from a deed gift issued by Emperor Henry II in the year 1002. "Dorf" is a German suffix for village or settlement. The castle itself was not mentioned until in 1253, the time when the keep (Bergfried) was erected. Held by the Prince-Archbishops of Salzburg, the fortress was significantly enlarged under the rule of the archbishops Burkhard Weisbriach (1420/23–1466) and Leonhard von Keutschach (c. 1442–1519) during the 15th century, to reach the form it still has today.

=== Modern period ===
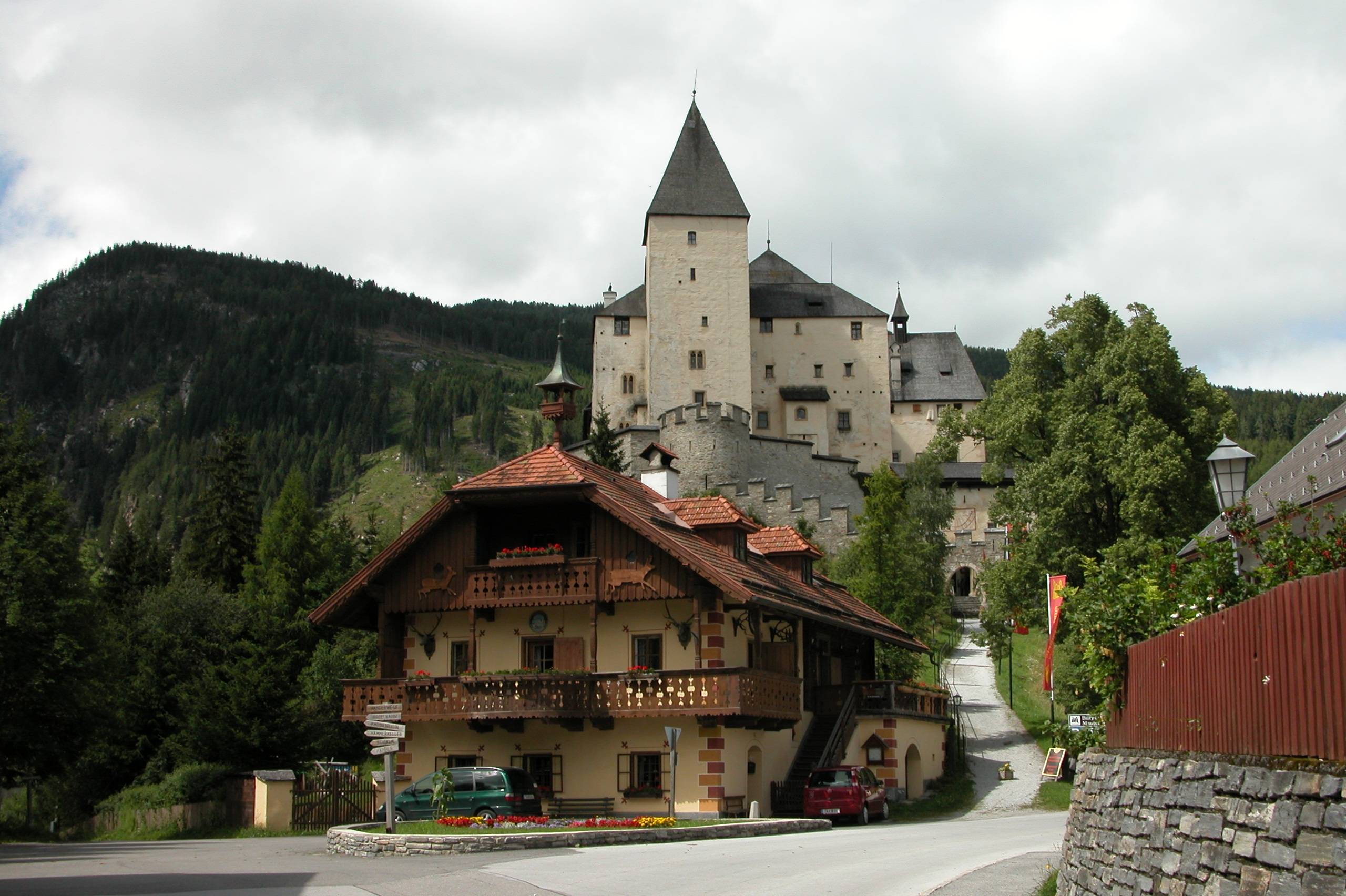
View from Mauterndorf

The toll system on the Radtsädter Tauern Pass road supported the castle and village until 1803 when the toll collection was abandoned during the Napoleonic Wars. In 1806 the castle became a possession of the Austrian state.

In 1894 the Mautendorf Castle was purchased by Hermann Epenstein (1851–1934), a Christian of Jewish descent, who served as a Prussian Army surgeon in Berlin. He refurbished and restored the decayed castle with great effort for use as a residence. In 1908 he obtained the minor title of a Ritter von Mauternburg from the Austrian emperor Franz Joseph I for his meritorious services and donation to the Crown.

During his service in German South-West Africa in the late 1880s, Epenstein had become friends with Commissioner Heinrich Ernst Göring. Back in Germany, he offered the Göring family hospitality in his residences. He became the attending physician (and only slightly hidden lover) of Göring's wife Franziska, as well as the godfather and mentor of his children. The Göring family, among them the younger sons Hermann and Albert, frequently stayed at Mauterndorf Castle as Epenstein's guests. Epenstein later became a naturalized Austrian citizen and retired after World War I to live in Mauterndorf. In 1923 he received Hermann Göring who had fled from Germany after the failed Beer Hall Putsch to evade criminal prosecution.

When Epenstein died in 1934, the property would pass to his widow who herself bequested the castle to Epenstein's godson Hermann Göring on her death in 1939. Göring, however, never was formally the owner of the castle as an entry in the land register never occurred, which was decided in a yearlong lawsuit between Epenstein's heirs and the state of Germany. At the end of World War II, Göring tried to flee to 'the castle of my youth', he did however surrender to U.S. Army forces at nearby Bruck because he was afraid of Red Army troops proceeding up the Mur valley towards Mauterndorf.

=== Museum, cultural venue ===
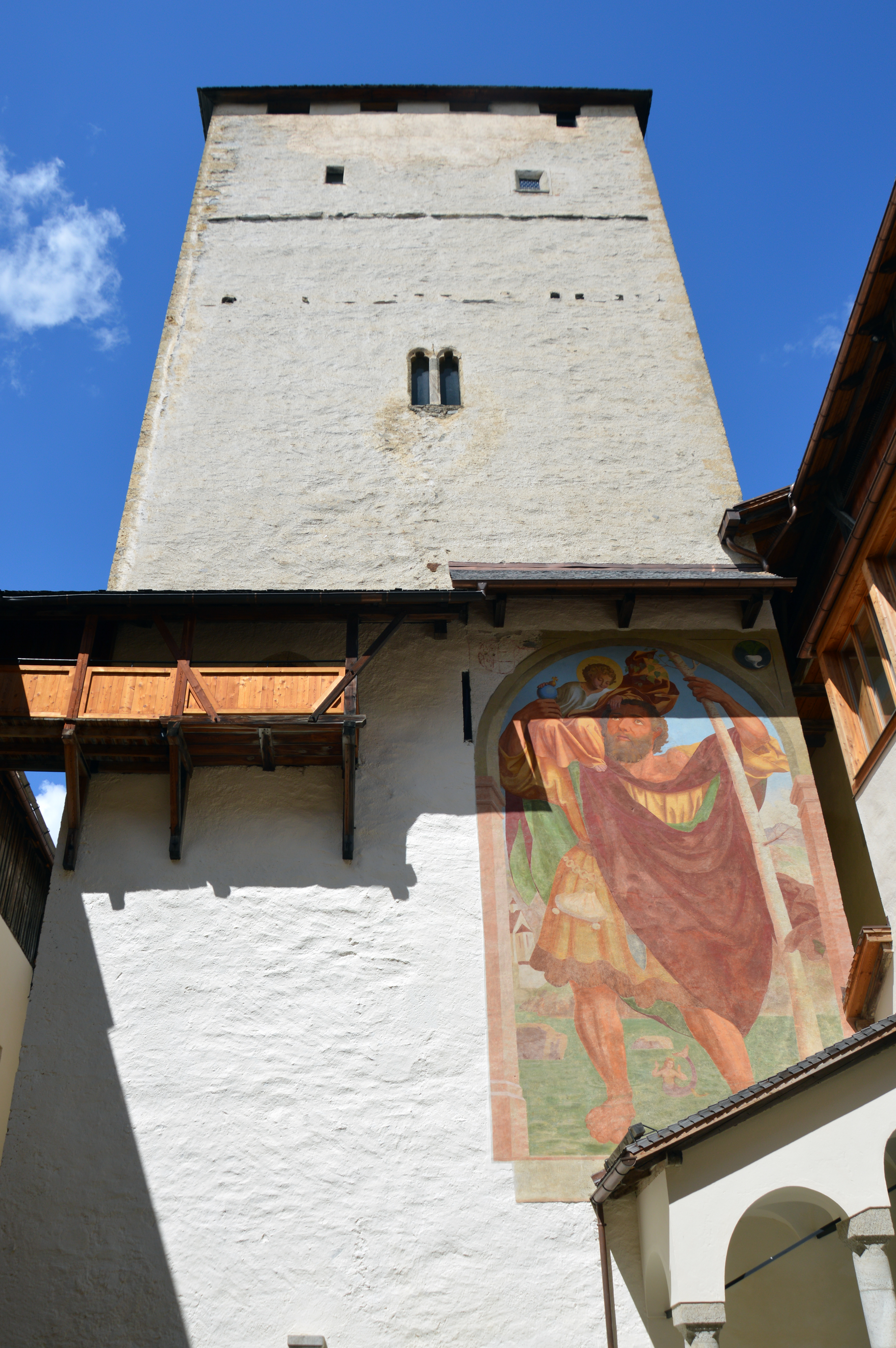
View of the keep from the castle courtyard, 2023.

Since 1968 the building has been owned by the state of Salzburg, and a castle museum was established in 2003. A number of other enterprises share the premises, including a noted local restaurant and catering service. Other uses have been as a meeting place for scientific conferences of international standing and as venue for various cultural events. The Lungau Regional Museum opened in May 2007 under the guidance of curator Helga Gappmayer. The museum has undergone several stages of construction to achieve its theme of "Tradition with a new look".

== See also ==
- List of castles in Austria
