= Hermann Epenstein =

German-Austrian physician and merchant

- Born: 1850 or 1851; Berlin, Prussia
- Died: June 5, 1934; Mauterndorf, Austria
- Other name: Hermann Epenstein Ritter von Mauternburg
- Occupations: Physician; merchant
- Spouse: Elisabeth "Lilly" Schandrovich Edle von Kriegstreu
- Partner: Franziska Tiefenbrunn (lover)
- Children: Five stepchildren, including Hermann Göring and Albert Göring

Hermann Epenstein (1850 or 1851 – June 5, 1934), known from 1910 until the abolition of nobility in Austria in 1919 as Hermann Epenstein Ritter von Mauternburg; was a German-Austrian physician and merchant.

He was best known as the owner of Mauterndorf Castle, which he had extensively rebuilt, refurbished, and restored; and for being the godfather, and later stepfather, to Albert and Hermann Göring.

== Biography ==
Epenstein was the son of a Catholic mother and a father who had converted from Judaism to marry, and was therefore considered a Mischling (half-Jew) in Nazi terminology. He became a royal Prussian staff physician. Through trade, he became very wealthy and held politically German nationalist views.

During a stay in German South West Africa, he met the local imperial commissioner Heinrich Ernst Göring and his wife Franziska Tiefenbrunn (1859–15 July 1943), a Bavarian peasant, whom he assisted in childbirth. Back in Germany, the Görings lived in his house in Berlin-Friedenau (Fregestraße 19). Franziska became Epenstein's lover. She openly maintained the relationship with him, staying with him during visits while her husband was accommodated elsewhere. Epenstein became the godfather of all five of Göring's children from his second marriage, including Hermann and Albert.

In 1894, Epenstein acquired the dilapidated Mauterndorf Castle in Salzburg and had it rebuilt by 1904. In 1897, he also bought Veldenstein Castle north of Nuremberg for 20,000 marks. He invested over a million marks until 1914 to restore the castle's former appearance. Epenstein made the castle available as a residence for the Göring family. Hermann Göring also visited his "adoptive father" Epenstein at Mauterndorf Castle, which he later called "the castle of his youth." Epenstein's fondness for castles and medieval splendor shaped the young Hermann's imagination.

In 1909, Epenstein became an Austrian citizen and lived in Mauterndorf after World War I. In appreciation of the reconstruction of Mauterndorf Castle, Emperor Franz Joseph I ennobled him on August 8, 1910, into the knightly rank.

In 1913, relations soured between the Görings and Epenstein after he married for the first time at the age of 62: the much younger Elisabeth "Lilly" Schandrovich Edle von Kriegstreu (1887–1939).

After the failed Beer Hall Putsch in 1923, Göring found refuge with Epenstein in Mauterndorf. When Epenstein died in 1934, he left the castles to his wife, who in turn appointed Göring, as per Epenstein's wish, as the heir.
