= Hermann Göring =

German Nazi politician and military leader (1893–1946)

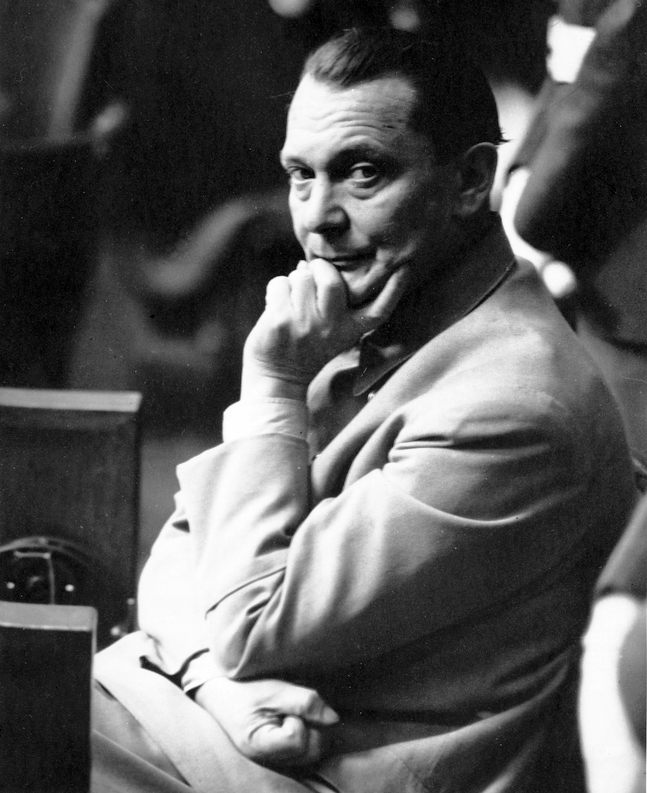
- Göring at the Nuremberg trials, c. 1946

16th President of the Reichstag
- In office 30 August 1932 – 23 April 1945
- President: Paul von Hindenburg (1932–1934)
- Führer: Adolf Hitler (1934–1945)
- Chancellor: Franz von Papen (1932); Kurt von Schleicher (1932–1933); Adolf Hitler (1933–1945)
- Preceded by: Paul Löbe
- Succeeded by: Office abolished: Erich Köhler (President of the West German Bundestag in 1949); Johannes Dieckmann (President of the East German People's Chamber in 1949); Bolesław Bierut (President of the Polish State National Council in former eastern territories)

Chief of the Luftwaffe High Command
- In office 1 March 1935 – 23 April 1945
- Deputy: Erhard Milch
- Führer: Adolf Hitler
- Preceded by: Office established
- Succeeded by: Robert Ritter von Greim

Reichsstatthalter of Prussia
- Acting; 25 April 1933 – 23 April 1945
- Preceded by: Adolf Hitler
- Succeeded by: Office abolished

Ministerpräsident of Prussia
- In office 11 April 1933 – 23 April 1945
- Preceded by: Franz von Papen (Reichskommissar)
- Succeeded by: Office abolished
Additional positions
1939–1945	Chairman of the Council of Ministers for Defense of the Reich
1937–1938	Reichsminister of Economics
1936–1945	Reich Plenipotentiary of the Four Year Plan
1934–1945	Reichsminister of Forestry
1933–1945	Reichsminister of Aviation
1933–1945	President of the Prussian State Council
1933–1945	Member of the Greater German Reichstag
1928–1933	Member of the Reichstag
1923	Oberster SA-Führer

Personal details
- Born: Hermann Wilhelm Göring; 12 January 1893 Rosenheim, Germany
- Died: 15 October 1946 (aged 53) Nuremberg, Germany
- Cause of death: Suicide by cyanide poisoning
- Party: Nazi Party (1922–1945)
- Spouses: Carin von Kantzow (m. 1923; died 1931) Emmy Sonnemann (m. 1935)
- Children: Edda Göring
- Parent: Heinrich Ernst Göring (father)
- Relatives: Albert Göring (brother)
- Education: Ludwig-Maximilians-Universität München
- Occupation: Aviator; politician
- Cabinet: Hitler cabinet

Military service
- Allegiance: German Empire; Nazi Germany
- Branch/service: Imperial German Army; Luftstreitkräfte; Sturmabteilung; Luftwaffe
- Years of service: 1912–1918; 1933–1945
- Rank: Reichsmarschall; SA-Obergruppenführer; Reichsforst- und Reichsjägermeister
- Commands: Jagdgeschwader 1
- Battles/wars: World War I; World War II
- Awards: Pour le Mérite; Grand Cross of the Iron Cross
- Criminal information
- Status: Deceased
- Convictions: Conspiracy to commit crimes against peace Crimes of aggression War crimes Crimes against humanity
- Trial: Nuremberg trials
- Penalty: Death

Hermann Wilhelm Göring (or Goering; (Note: Göring is the German spelling, but the name is commonly transliterated as Goering in English and other languages, using ⟨oe⟩, an alternative German spelling for ö (o with an umlaut) in general.) German: [ˈhɛʁman ˈvɪlhɛlm ˈɡøːʁɪŋ]; 12 January 1893 – 15 October 1946) was a German politician, aviator, military commander, and convicted war criminal. He was one of the most powerful figures in the Nazi Party, which controlled Germany from 1933 to 1945. He also served as Oberbefehlshaber der Luftwaffe (Supreme Commander of the Air Force), a position he held until the final days of the regime.

He was born in Rosenheim, Bavaria. A veteran World War I fighter pilot ace, Göring was a recipient of the Pour le Mérite. He served as the last commander of Jagdgeschwader 1 (JG I), the fighter wing once led by Manfred von Richthofen. An early member of the Nazi Party, Göring was among those wounded in Adolf Hitler's failed Beer Hall Putsch in 1923. While receiving treatment for his injuries, he developed an addiction to morphine that persisted until the last year of his life. After Hitler became Chancellor of Germany in 1933, Göring was named as minister without portfolio in the new government. One of his first acts as a cabinet minister was to oversee the creation of the Gestapo, which he ceded to Heinrich Himmler in 1934.

Following the establishment of the Nazi state, Göring amassed power and political capital to become the second most powerful man in Germany. Upon being named Plenipotentiary of the Four Year Plan in 1936, Göring was entrusted with the task of mobilising all sectors of the economy for war, an assignment which brought numerous government agencies under his control. In September 1939, Hitler gave a speech to the Reichstag designating him as his successor. After the Fall of France in 1940, he was bestowed the specially created rank of Reichsmarschall, which gave him seniority over all officers in Germany's armed forces.

By 1941, Göring was at the peak of his power and influence. As the Second World War progressed, Göring's standing with Hitler and the German public declined after the Luftwaffe proved incapable of preventing the Allied bombing of Germany's cities and resupplying surrounded Axis forces in Stalingrad. Around that time, Göring increasingly withdrew from military and political affairs to devote his attention to collecting property and artwork, much of which was stolen from Jewish victims of the Holocaust. Informed on 22 April 1945 that Hitler intended to commit suicide, Göring sent a telegram to Hitler requesting his permission to assume leadership of the Reich. Considering his request an act of treason, Hitler removed Göring from all his positions, expelled him from the party and ordered his arrest.

After the war, Göring was convicted of conspiracy, crimes against peace, war crimes, and crimes against humanity at the Nuremberg trials in 1946. He requested at trial an execution by firing squad, but was denied; instead, he was sentenced to death by hanging. He died of suicide by ingesting cyanide the night before his scheduled execution.

== Early life ==
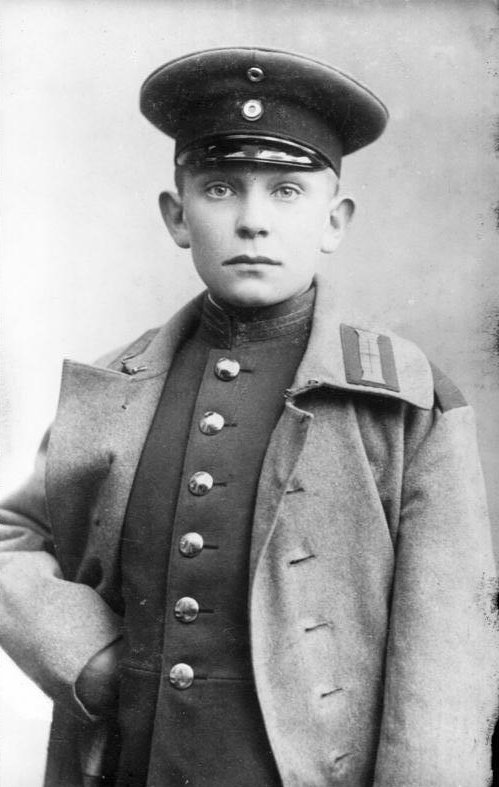
Göring in 1907, at age 14

Hermann Wilhelm Göring was born on 12 January 1893 at the Marienbad Sanatorium in Rosenheim, Bavaria. His father, Heinrich Ernst Göring (31 October 1839 – 7 December 1913), a former cavalry officer, had been the first governor-general of German South West Africa (modern-day Namibia). Heinrich had three children from a previous marriage. Göring was the fourth of five children by Heinrich's second wife, Franziska Tiefenbrunn (1859–15 July 1943), a Bavarian peasant. Göring's elder siblings were Karl, Olga, and Paula; his younger brother was Albert. When Göring was born, his father was serving as consul general in Haiti, and his mother had returned home briefly to give birth. She left the six-week-old baby with a friend in Bavaria and did not see the child again for three years, when she and Heinrich returned to Germany.

Göring's godfather was Hermann Epenstein, a wealthy Jewish physician and businessman, his father had met in Africa. Epenstein provided the Göring family, who were surviving on Heinrich's pension, first with a family home in Berlin-Friedenau, and then a small castle called Burg Veldenstein, near Nuremberg. Göring's mother became Epenstein's mistress around this time and remained so for some fifteen years. Epenstein acquired the minor title of Ritter (knight) von Epenstein through service and donations to the Crown.

Interested in a career as a soldier from a very early age, Göring enjoyed playing with toy soldiers and dressing up in a Boer uniform his father had given him. He was sent to boarding school at age eleven, where the food was poor and discipline harsh. He sold a violin to pay for his train ticket home and then took to his bed, feigning illness, until he was told he would not have to return. He continued to enjoy war games, pretending to lay siege to the castle Veldenstein and studying Teutonic legends and sagas. He became a mountain climber, scaling peaks in Germany, at the Mont Blanc massif and in the Austrian Alps. At age 16, he was sent to a military academy in Berlin-Lichterfelde, from which he graduated with distinction.

Göring joined the Prince Wilhelm Regiment (112th Infantry, Garrison: Mülhausen) of the Prussian Army in 1912. The next year, his mother had a falling-out with Epenstein. The family was forced to leave Veldenstein and moved to Munich; Göring's father died shortly afterwards. It was in Bavaria where Göring developed his "romantic sense of Germanness" that further evolved under Nazism. When World War I began in August 1914, Göring was stationed at Mülhausen with his regiment.

== World War I ==
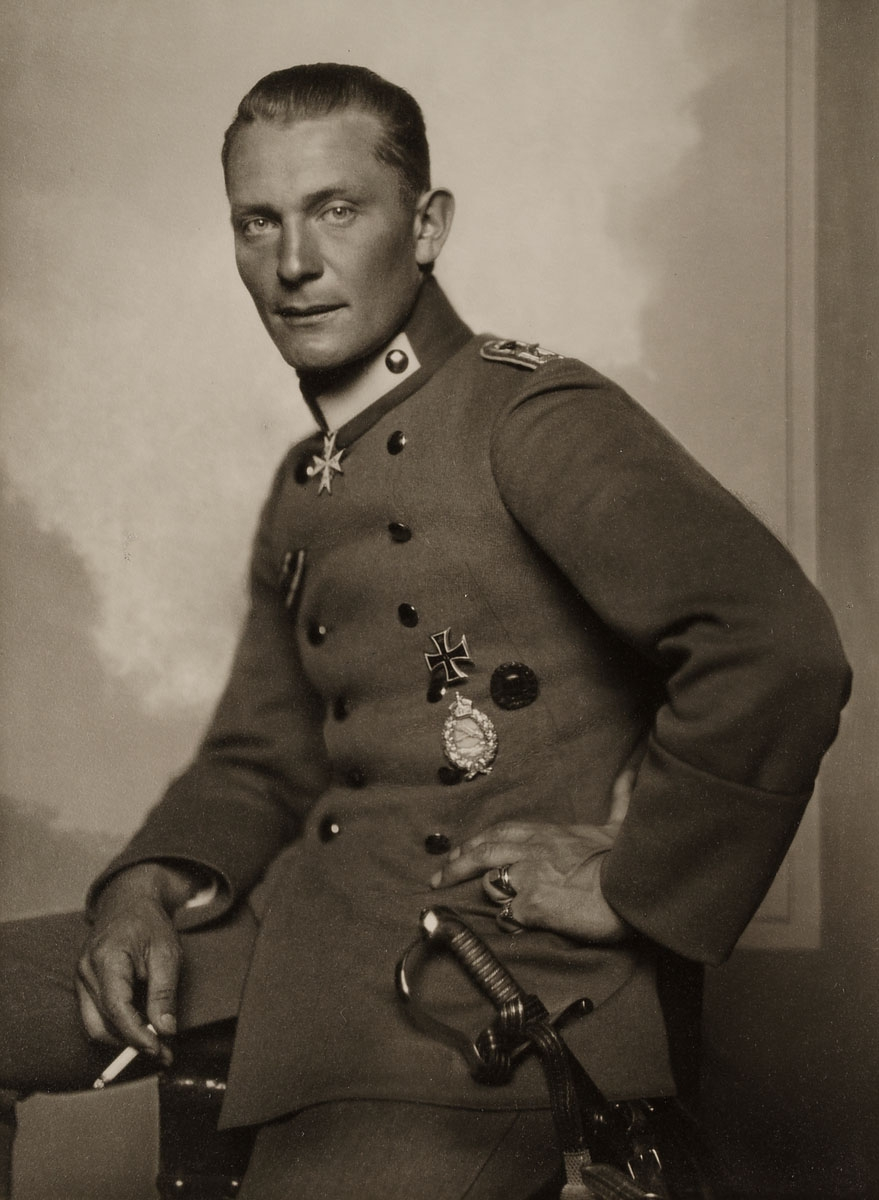
Göring with the Pour le Mérite and several awards in 1918

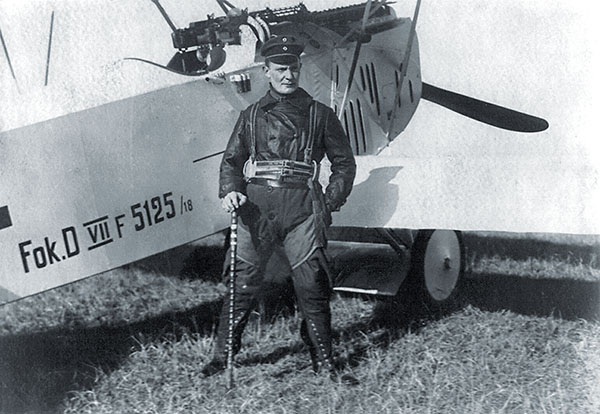
Göring in 1918 as commander of Jagdgeschwader 1 beside his Fokker D VII (F) 5125/18. He holds a walking stick Geschwader Stock that had been owned by Manfred von Richthofen.

During the first year of World War I, Göring served with his infantry regiment in the area of Mülhausen, a garrison town less than 2 km from the French frontier. He was hospitalised with rheumatism, a result of the damp of trench warfare. While he was recovering, his friend Bruno Loerzer convinced him to transfer to what would become, by October 1916, the Luftstreitkräfte (transl. air combat forces) of the German army, but his request was turned down. Later that year, Göring flew as Loerzer's observer in Feldflieger Abteilung 25 (FFA 25); Göring had informally transferred himself. He was discovered and sentenced to three weeks' confinement to barracks, but the sentence was never carried out. By the time it was supposed to be imposed, Göring's association with Loerzer had been made official. They were assigned as a team to FFA 25 in the Crown Prince's Fifth Army. They flew reconnaissance and bombing missions, for which the crown prince invested both Göring and Loerzer with the Iron Cross, first class.

After completing the pilot's training course, Göring was assigned to Jagdstaffel 5. Seriously wounded in the hip in aerial combat, he took nearly a year to recover. He was then transferred to Jagdstaffel 26, commanded by Loerzer, in February 1917. He steadily scored air victories until May, when he was assigned to command Jagdstaffel 27. Serving with Jastas 5, 26 and 27, he continued to win victories. In addition to his Iron Crosses (1st and 2nd Class), he received the Zähringer Lion with swords, the Friedrich Order, the House Order of Hohenzollern with swords third class and, finally, in May 1918, the coveted Pour le Mérite. According to Hermann Dahlmann, who knew both men, Göring had Loerzer lobby for the award. He finished the war with 22 victories. A thorough post-war examination of Allied loss records showed that only two of his awarded victories were doubtful. Three were possible and 17 were certain, or highly likely.

On 7 July 1918, following the death of Wilhelm Reinhard, successor to Manfred von Richthofen, Göring was made commander of the "Flying Circus", Jagdgeschwader 1. His arrogance made him unpopular with the men of his squadron. In one incident, pilot Willi Gabriel took off against Göring's orders and shot down several enemy planes. When he returned to base, Göring ordered him grounded.

In the last days of the war, Göring was repeatedly ordered to withdraw his squadron, first to Tellancourt airdrome, then to Darmstadt. At one point, he was ordered to surrender the aircraft to the Allies; he refused. Many of his pilots intentionally crash-landed their planes to keep them from falling into enemy hands.

Like many other German veterans, Göring was a proponent of the stab-in-the-back myth, the belief which held that the German Army had not really lost the war, but instead was betrayed by the civilian leadership: Marxists, Jews and especially the republicans, who had overthrown the German monarchy. Atop the frustration of military defeat, Göring also experienced the personal disappointment of being snubbed by his fiancée's upper-class family, who broke off the engagement when he returned penniless from the front.

== After World War I ==
Göring remained in aviation after the war. He tried barnstorming and briefly worked at Fokker. After spending most of 1919 living in Denmark, he moved to Sweden and joined Svensk Lufttrafik, a Swedish airline. Göring was often hired for private flights. During the winter of 1920–1921, he was hired by Count Eric von Rosen to fly him to his castle from Stockholm. Invited to spend the night, Göring may at this time have first seen the swastika emblem, which Rosen had set in the chimney piece as a family badge. (Note: The swastika was a badge that the count and some friends had adopted at school, and he adopted it as a family emblem. See Manvell & Fraenkel 2011, pp. 403–404.)

This was also the first time that Göring saw his future wife; the count introduced his sister-in-law, Baroness Carin von Kantzow (née Freiin von Fock). Estranged from her husband of 10 years, she had an eight-year-old son. Göring was immediately infatuated and asked her to meet him in Stockholm. They arranged a visit to the home of her parents and spent much time together through 1921, when Göring left to study political science at the Ludwig-Maximilians-Universität München. Carin obtained a divorce, followed Göring to Munich and married him on 3 February 1922. Their first home together was a hunting lodge at Hochkreuth in the Bavarian Alps, near Bayrischzell, some 80 kilometres (50 mi) from Munich. Later in 1922, they moved to Obermenzing, a suburb of Munich.

== Early Nazi career ==
Göring (left) stands in front of Hitler at a Nazi Party rally in Nuremberg (1929).

Göring joined the Nazi Party in 1922 after hearing a speech by Adolf Hitler. He was given command of the Sturmabteilung (SA) as the Oberster SA-Führer on 1 March 1923, succeeding Hans Ulrich Klintzsch, and headed the organisation until it was banned in November 1923.

Through the early years, Carin – who liked Hitler – often played hostess to meetings of leading Nazis, including her husband as well as Hitler, Rudolf Hess, Alfred Rosenberg and Ernst Röhm. Hitler later recalled his early association with Göring:

I liked him. I made him the head of my SA. He is the only one of its heads who ran the SA properly. I gave him a dishevelled rabble. In a very short time, he had organised a division of 11,000 men.

Hitler and the Nazi Party held mass meetings and rallies in Munich and elsewhere during the early 1920s, attempting to gain supporters in a bid for political power. Inspired by Benito Mussolini's March on Rome, the Nazis attempted to seize power on 8–9 November 1923 in a failed coup known as the Beer Hall Putsch. Göring, who was with Hitler leading the march to the War Ministry, was shot in the groin. Fourteen Nazis and four policemen were killed; many top Nazis, including Hitler, were arrested. With Carin's help, Göring was smuggled to Innsbruck, where he received surgery and was given morphine for the pain. He remained in hospital until 24 December. This was the beginning of his morphine addiction, which lasted until his imprisonment at Nuremberg. Meanwhile, the authorities in Munich declared Göring a wanted man. The Görings—acutely short of funds and reliant on the good will of Nazi sympathisers abroad—moved from Austria to Venice. In May 1924, they visited Rome, via Florence and Siena. Sometime in 1924, Göring met Mussolini through his contacts with members of Italy's Fascist Party; Mussolini had also expressed an interest in meeting Hitler, who was by then in prison. Hitler penned Mein Kampf while incarcerated, before being released in December 1924.

Meanwhile, personal problems continued to multiply for Göring. By 1925, Carin's mother was ill. The Görings—with difficulty—raised the money in the spring of 1925 for a journey to Sweden via Austria, Czechoslovakia, Poland and Danzig (now Gdańsk). Göring had become a violent morphine addict; Carin's family were shocked by his deterioration. Carin, who was ill with epilepsy and a weak heart, had to allow the doctors to take charge of Göring; her son was taken by his father. Göring was certified as a dangerous drug addict and was placed in Långbro Asylum on 1 September 1925 after he had violently attacked a nurse who had refused his request for morphine. He was violent to the point where he had to be confined in a straitjacket, but his psychiatrist felt he was sane; the condition was caused solely by the morphine. Weaned off the drug, he left the facility briefly, but had to return for further treatment. He returned to Germany when an amnesty was declared in 1927 and resumed working in the aircraft industry. Carin Göring, ill with epilepsy and tuberculosis, died of heart failure on 17 October 1931.

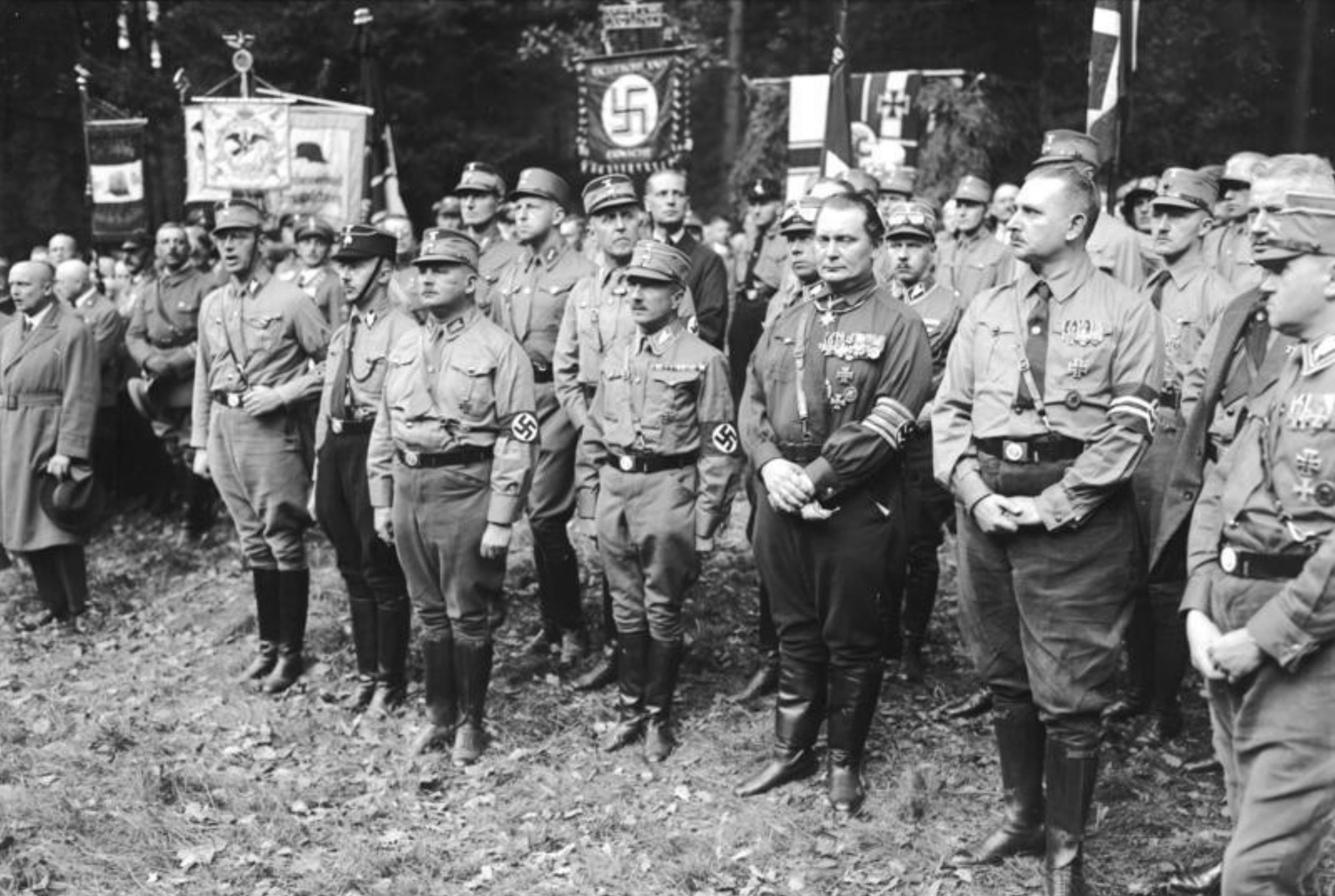
Camp service of the NSDAP delegation; in the first row SS Chief Heinrich Himmler, SA Chief Ernst Röhm and Göring, 1931

Meanwhile, the Nazi Party was in a period of rebuilding and waiting. The economy had recovered, which meant fewer opportunities for the Nazis to agitate. The SA was reorganised, but with Franz Pfeffer von Salomon as its head rather than Göring, and the Schutzstaffel (SS) was founded in 1925, initially as a bodyguard for Hitler. Membership in the party increased from 27,000 in 1925 to 108,000 in 1928 and 178,000 in 1929. In the May 1928 elections the Nazi Party only obtained 12 seats out of an available 491 in the Reichstag. Göring was elected as a representative from Bavaria. Having secured a seat in the Reichstag, Göring gained a more prominent place in the Nazi movement, since Hitler saw him as a public relations officer for Nazism in this capacity. Göring continued to be elected to the Reichstag in all subsequent elections during the Weimar and Nazi regimes. Electoral success also afforded Göring with access to powerful sympathisers to the Nazi cause, such as Prince August Wilhelm of Prussia and the conservative-minded businessmen, Fritz Thyssen and Hjalmar Schacht. The Great Depression led to a disastrous downturn in the German economy, and in the 1930 election, the Nazi Party won 6,409,600 votes and 107 seats. (Note: By 1930, the Nazi party claimed upwards of 293,000 members.) In May 1931, Hitler sent Göring on a mission to the Vatican, where he met the future Pope Pius XII. He was appointed an SA-Gruppenführer on 18 December 1931. On 1 January 1933, he was among the first to be promoted to the recently created rank of SA-Obergruppenführer and he held this rank on the SA rolls until 1945.

In the July 1932 election, the Nazis won 230 seats to become far and away the largest party in the Reichstag. By longstanding tradition, the Nazis were thus entitled to select the President of the Reichstag, and elected Göring to the post. He would retain this position until 23 April 1945.

== Reichstag fire ==
The Reichstag fire occurred on the night of 27 February 1933. Göring was one of the first to arrive on the scene. Marinus van der Lubbe, a Communist radical, was arrested and claimed sole responsibility for the fire. Göring immediately called for a crackdown on Communists.

The Nazis took full advantage of the fire to advance their own aims at consolidating political power. The Reichstag Fire Decree, passed the next day on Hitler's urging, suspended basic rights and allowed state detention without habeas corpus. Activities of the German Communist Party were suppressed, and some 4,000 Party members were arrested. Göring demanded that the prisoners should be shot, but Rudolf Diels, head of the Prussian political police, ignored the order. Although the consensus amongst historians is that van der Lubbe set the fire, a few accuse the Nazis of staging a false flag attack. At the Nuremberg trials, General Franz Halder testified that Göring admitted responsibility for starting the fire at a luncheon held on Hitler's birthday in 1942. In his own Nuremberg testimony, Göring denied this story.

== Second marriage ==
During the early 1930s, Göring was often in the company of Emmy Sonnemann, an actress from Hamburg. They were married on 10 April 1935, in Berlin. The wedding was celebrated on a huge scale. A large reception was held the night before at the Berlin Opera House. Fighter aircraft flew overhead on the night of the reception and the day of the ceremony, at which Hitler was best man. Göring's daughter, Edda, was born on 2 June 1938.

== Nazi potentate ==
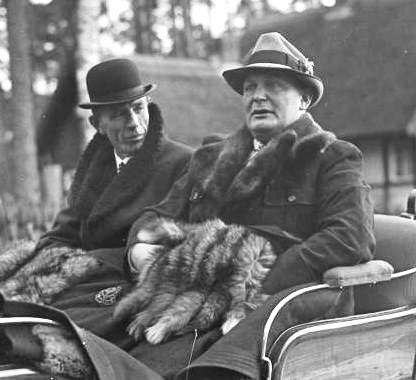
Göring with British War Secretary Lord Halifax at Schorfheide, 20 November 1937

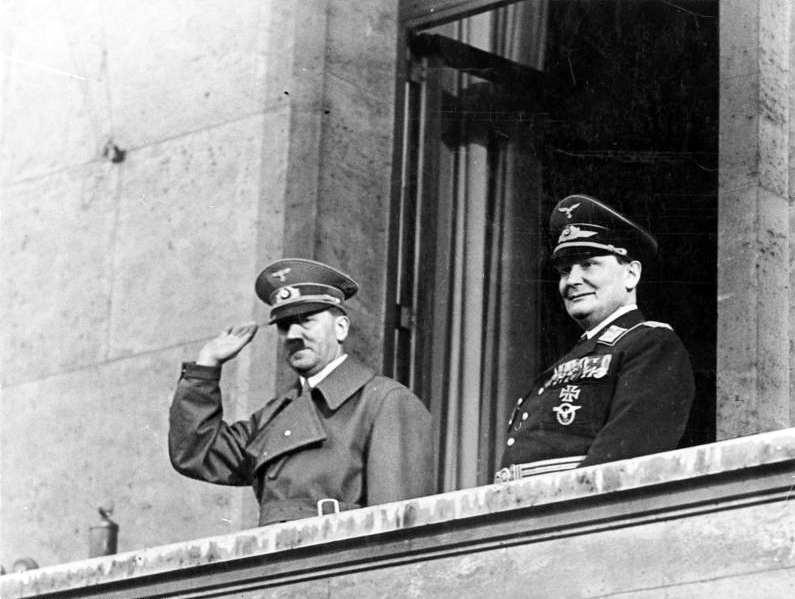
Hitler with Göring on balcony of the Chancellery, Berlin, 16 March 1938

When Hitler was named chancellor of Germany on 30 January 1933, Göring was appointed as Reichsminister without portfolio and Reichskommissar of Aviation. This was followed on 11 April 1933 by his appointment as Minister-President of Prussia, Prussian interior minister and chief of the Prussian police. On 25 April 1933, Hitler also delegated his powers as Reichsstatthalter (Reich Governor) of Prussia to Göring. On 18 May 1933, Göring secured passage of an enabling act through the Landtag of Prussia that conferred all legislative powers on the cabinet.

Using this authority, on 8 July 1933, Göring enacted a law abolishing the Prussian State Council, the second chamber of the Prussian legislature that represented the interests of the Prussian provinces. In its place, he created a revised non-legislative Prussian State Council to serve merely as a body of advisors to him. Göring would serve as President of the council. It would consist, ex officio, of the Prussian cabinet ministers and state secretaries, as well as hand-picked Nazi Party officials and other industry and society leaders selected solely by Göring. In October 1933, Göring was made a member of Hans Frank's Academy for German Law at its inaugural meeting. In July 1934, he was appointed Reichforstmeister, with the rank of a Reichsminister, as the head of the newly created Reich Forestry Office.

Wilhelm Frick, the Reich interior minister, and the head of the SS, Heinrich Himmler, hoped to create a unified police force for all of Germany, but Göring, on 26 April 1933, established a special Prussian police force, with Rudolf Diels at its head. The force was called the Geheime Staatspolizei (transl. Secret State Police), or Gestapo. Göring, thinking that Diels was not ruthless enough to use the Gestapo effectively to counteract the power of the SA, handed over control of the Gestapo to Himmler on 20 April 1934. By this time, the SA numbered over two million men.

Hitler was deeply concerned that Ernst Röhm, the chief of the SA, was planning a coup. Himmler and Reinhard Heydrich plotted with Göring to use the Gestapo and SS to crush the SA. Members of the SA got wind of the proposed action and thousands of them took to the streets in violent demonstrations on the night of 29 June 1934. Enraged, Hitler ordered the arrest of the SA leadership. Röhm was shot dead in his cell when he refused to commit suicide; Göring personally went over the lists of prisoners – numbering in the thousands – and determined who else should be shot. At least 85 people were killed in the period of 30 June to 2 July, which is now known as the Night of the Long Knives. Hitler admitted in the Reichstag on 13 July that the killings had been entirely illegal but claimed a plot had been under way to overthrow the Reich. A retroactive law was passed, making the action legal. Any criticism was met with arrests.

One of the terms of the Treaty of Versailles, which had been in place since the end of World War I, stated that Germany was not allowed to maintain an air force. After the 1928 signing of the Kellogg–Briand Pact, police aircraft were permitted. Göring was appointed Air Traffic Minister in May 1933. Germany began to accumulate aircraft in violation of the Treaty, and in 1935 the existence of the Luftwaffe was formally acknowledged, with Göring as Reich Aviation Minister.

During a cabinet meeting in September 1936, Göring and Hitler announced that the German rearmament programme must be sped up. On 18 October, Hitler named Göring as Plenipotentiary of the Four Year Plan to undertake this task. Göring created a new organisation to administer the Plan and drew the ministries of labour and agriculture under its umbrella. He bypassed the Economics Ministry in his policy-making decisions, to the chagrin of Hjalmar Schacht, the minister in charge. Huge expenditures were made on rearmament, in spite of growing deficits. Schacht resigned on 26 November 1937, and Göring took over the Economics Ministry on an interim basis until January 1938. He then managed to install Walther Funk in the position, who also took control of the Reichsbank when Schacht was forced out of that post as well in January 1939. In this way, both of these institutions were effectively brought under Göring's control under the auspices of the Four Year Plan. In July 1937, the Reichswerke Hermann Göring was established under state ownership – though led by Göring – with the aim of boosting steel production beyond the level which private enterprise could economically provide.

In 1938, Göring was involved in the Blomberg–Fritsch Affair, which led to the resignations of the War Minister, Generalfeldmarschall Werner von Blomberg, and the army commander, General Werner von Fritsch. Göring had acted as witness at Blomberg's wedding to Margarethe Gruhn, a 26-year-old typist, on 12 January 1938. Information received from the police showed that the young bride was a prostitute. Göring felt obligated to tell Hitler, but also saw this event as an opportunity to dispose of Blomberg. Blomberg was forced to resign. Göring did not want Fritsch to be appointed to that position and thus be his superior. Several days later, Heydrich revealed a file on Fritsch that contained allegations of homosexual activity and blackmail. The charges were later proven to be false, but Fritsch had lost Hitler's trust and was forced to resign. Hitler used the dismissals as an opportunity to reshuffle the leadership of the military. Göring asked for the post of War Minister but was turned down; he was appointed to the rank of Generalfeldmarschall. Hitler took over as supreme commander of the armed forces and created subordinate posts to head the three main branches of service.

As minister in charge of the Four-Year Plan, Göring became concerned with the lack of natural resources in Germany and began pushing for Austria to be incorporated into the Reich. The province of Styria had rich iron ore deposits, and the country as a whole was home to many skilled labourers who would also be useful. Hitler had always been in favour of a takeover of Austria, his native country. He met the Austrian Chancellor Kurt Schuschnigg on 12 February 1938, threatening invasion if peaceful unification was not forthcoming. The Nazi Party was made legal in Austria to gain a power base, and a referendum on reunification was scheduled for March. When Hitler did not approve of the wording of the plebiscite, Göring telephoned Schuschnigg and the Austrian head of state Wilhelm Miklas to demand Schuschnigg's resignation, threatening invasion by German troops and civil unrest by the Austrian Nazi Party members. Schuschnigg resigned on 11 March and the plebiscite was cancelled. By 5:30 the next morning, German troops that had been massing on the border marched into Austria, meeting no resistance.

Although Joachim von Ribbentrop had been named Foreign Minister in February 1938, Göring continued to involve himself in foreign affairs. That July, he contacted the British government with the idea that he should make an official visit to discuss Germany's intentions for Czechoslovakia. Neville Chamberlain was in favour of a meeting and there was talk of a pact being signed between Britain and Germany. In February 1938, Göring visited Warsaw to quell rumours about the upcoming invasion of Poland. He had conversations with the Hungarian government that summer as well, discussing their potential role in an invasion of Czechoslovakia. At the Nuremberg Rally that September, Göring and other speakers denounced the Czechs as an inferior race that must be conquered. Chamberlain and Hitler had a series of meetings that led to the signing of the Munich Agreement (29 September 1938), which turned over control of the Sudetenland to Germany. In March 1939, Göring threatened Czechoslovak president Emil Hácha with the bombing of Prague. Hácha then agreed to sign a communique accepting the German occupation of the remainder of Bohemia and Moravia.

Although many in the party disliked him, before the war Göring enjoyed widespread personal popularity among the German public because of his perceived sociability, colour and humour. As the Nazi leader most responsible for economic matters, he presented himself as a champion of national interests over allegedly corrupt big business and the old German elite. The Nazi press was on Göring's side. Other leaders, such as Hess and Ribbentrop, were envious of his popularity. In Britain and the United States, some viewed Göring as more acceptable than the other Nazis and as a possible mediator between the western democracies and Hitler.

== World War II ==
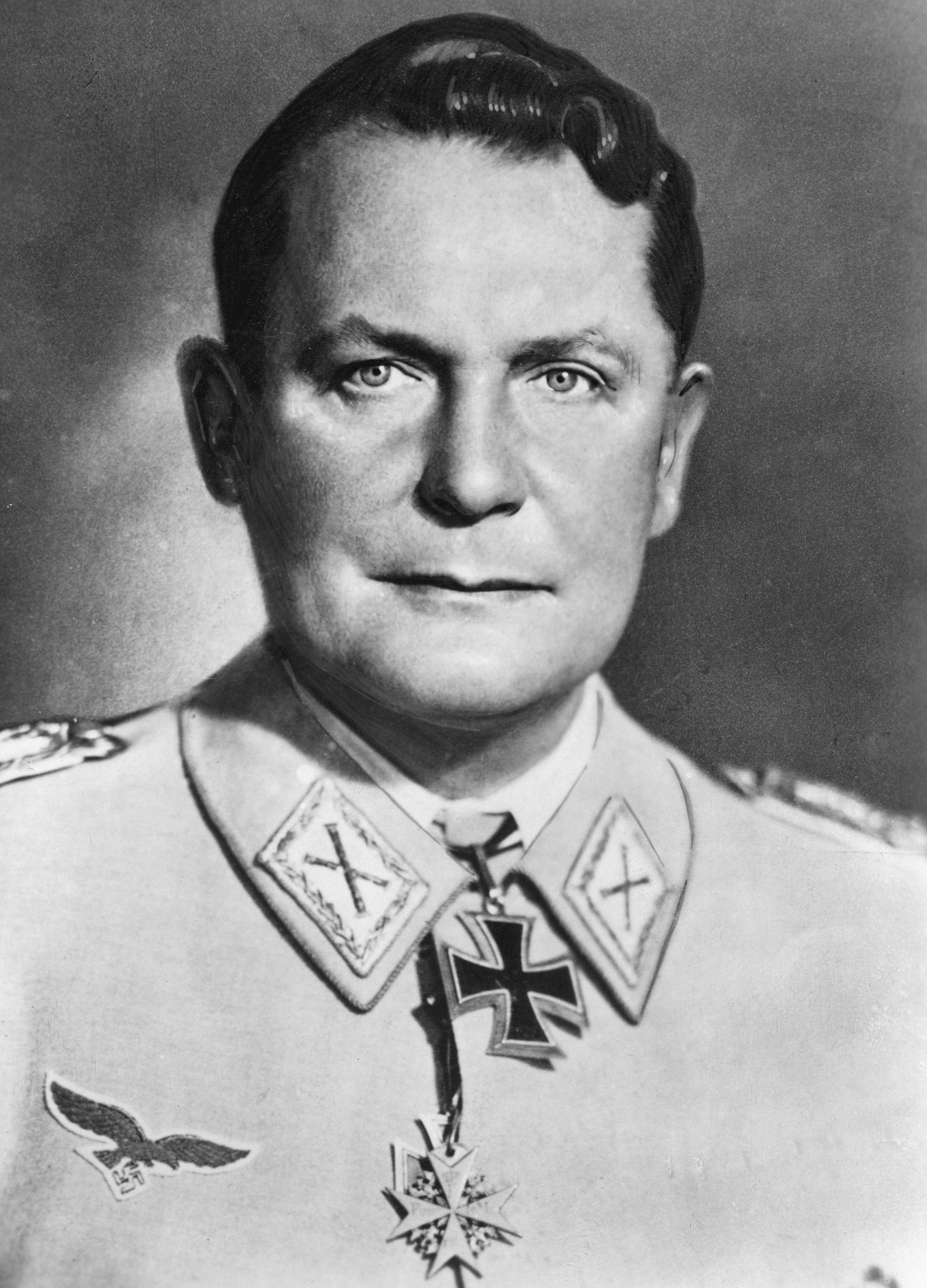
Göring as Reichsmarschall

=== Success on all fronts ===
Göring and other senior officers were concerned that Germany was not yet ready for war, but Hitler insisted on pushing ahead as soon as possible. On 30 August 1939, immediately prior to the outbreak of the Second World War, Hitler appointed Göring as the chairman of a new six-person Council of Ministers for the Defense of the Reich which was set up to operate as a war cabinet. The invasion of Poland, the opening action of World War II, began at dawn on 1 September 1939. Later in the day, speaking to the Reichstag, Hitler designated Göring as his successor as Führer of all Germany, "If anything should befall me", with Hess as the second alternate. Major German victories followed one after the other in quick succession. With the help of the Luftwaffe, the Polish Air Force was defeated within a week. The Fallschirmjäger seized vital airfields in Norway (Operation Weserübung) and captured Fort Eben-Emael in Belgium on 10 May 1940, the first day of the Battle of France. Göring's Luftwaffe played critical roles in the Battles of the Netherlands, of Belgium and of France in May 1940.

After the Fall of France, Hitler awarded Göring the Grand Cross of the Iron Cross for his successful leadership. During the 1940 Field Marshal Ceremony, Hitler promoted Göring to the rank of Reichsmarschall des Grossdeutschen Reiches (transl. Reich Marshal of the Greater German Reich), a specially created rank which made him senior to all field marshals in the military. As a result of this promotion, he was the highest-ranking soldier in Germany until the end of the war. Göring had already received the Knight's Cross of the Iron Cross on 30 September 1939 as Commander in Chief of the Luftwaffe.

The UK had declared war on Germany on 3 September 1939, the third day of the invasion of Poland. In July 1940, Hitler began preparations for an invasion of Britain. As part of the plan, the Royal Air Force (RAF) had to be neutralised. Bombing raids commenced on British air installations and on cities and centres of industry. Reportedly, Göring had by then already announced in a radio speech, "If as much as a single enemy aircraft flies over German soil, my name is Meier!", something that would return to haunt him when the RAF began bombing German cities on 11 May 1940. Though he was confident the Luftwaffe could defeat the RAF within days, Göring, like Admiral Erich Raeder, commander-in-chief of the Kriegsmarine (navy), was pessimistic about the chance of success of the planned invasion (codenamed Operation Sea Lion). Göring hoped that a victory in the air would be enough to force peace without an invasion. The campaign failed and Sea Lion was postponed indefinitely on 17 September 1940. After their defeat in the Battle of Britain, the Luftwaffe attempted to defeat Britain via strategic bombing. On 12 October 1940, Hitler cancelled Sea Lion due to the onset of winter. By the end of the year, it was clear that British morale was not being shaken by the Blitz, though the bombings continued through May 1941.

=== Defeat on all fronts ===
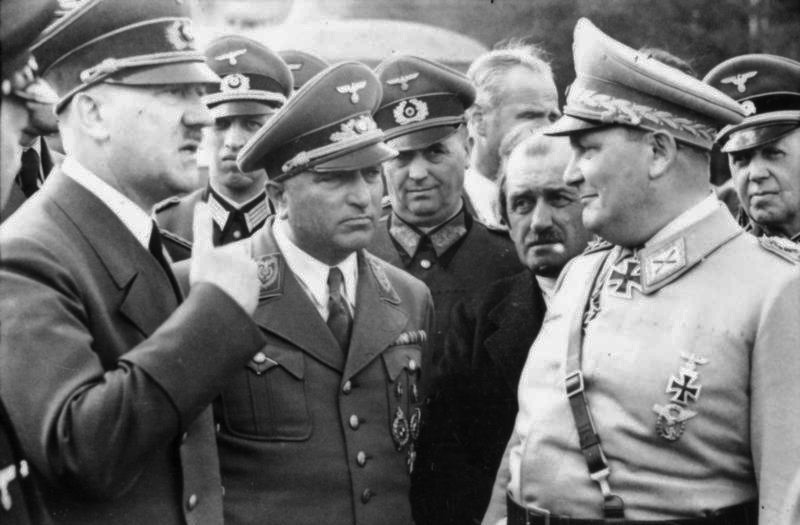
Hitler, Dr Robert Ley, automotive engineer Ferdinand Porsche and Göring at the Wolf's Lair in 1942

In spite of the Molotov–Ribbentrop Pact, signed in 1939, Nazi Germany began Operation Barbarossa — the invasion of the Soviet Union – on 22 June 1941. Initially, the Luftwaffe was at an advantage, destroying thousands of Soviet aircraft in the first month of fighting. Hitler and his top staff were sure that the campaign would be over by Christmas, and no provisions were made for reserves of men or equipment. However, by July, the Germans had only 1,000 planes remaining in operation and their troop losses were over 213,000 men. The choice was made to concentrate the attack on only one part of the vast front; efforts would be directed at capturing Moscow. After the long, but successful, Battle of Smolensk, Hitler ordered Army Group Centre to halt its advance to Moscow and temporarily diverted its Panzer groups north and south to aid in the encirclement of Leningrad and Kiev. The pause provided the Red Army with an opportunity to mobilise fresh reserves; historian Russel Stolfi considers it to be one of the major factors that caused the failure of the Moscow offensive, which was resumed in October 1941 with the Battle of Moscow. Poor weather conditions, fuel shortages, a delay in building aircraft bases in Eastern Europe and overstretched supply lines were also factors. Hitler did not give permission for even a partial retreat until mid-January 1942; by this time, the losses were comparable to those of the French invasion of Russia in 1812.

In late October or early November 1941, Hitler and Göring decided on the mass deportation of Soviet prisoners of war — and a larger number of Soviet civilians – to Germany for forced labour, but epidemics soon caused the halting of prisoner-of-war transports. Those who were deported to Germany faced conditions not necessarily any better than existed in the occupied Soviet Union. By the end of the war, at least 1.3 million Soviet prisoners of war had been deported to Germany or its annexed territories. Of these, 400,000 did not survive and most of these deaths occurred in the winter of 1941/1942.

After the attack on Pearl Harbor, Göring, along with Field Marshal Wilhelm Keitel and Admiral Erich Raeder, urged Hitler to immediately declare war on the United States.

Hitler decided that the summer 1942 campaign would be concentrated in the south; efforts would be made to capture the oilfields in the Caucasus. The Battle of Stalingrad, a major turning point of the war, began on 23 August 1942 with a bombing campaign by the Luftwaffe. The German Sixth Army entered the city, but because of its location on the front line, it was still possible for the Soviets to encircle and trap it there without reinforcements or supplies. When the Sixth Army was surrounded by the end of November in Operation Uranus, Göring promised that the Luftwaffe would be able to deliver a minimum of 300 tons of supplies to the trapped men every day. On the basis of these assurances, Hitler demanded that there be no retreat; they were to fight to the last man. Though some airlifts were able to get through, supplies delivered never exceeded 120 tons per day. The remnants of the Sixth Army – some 91,000 men out of an army of 285,000 – surrendered in early February 1943; only 5,000 of these captives survived the Soviet prisoner of war camps to see Germany again.

=== War over Germany ===
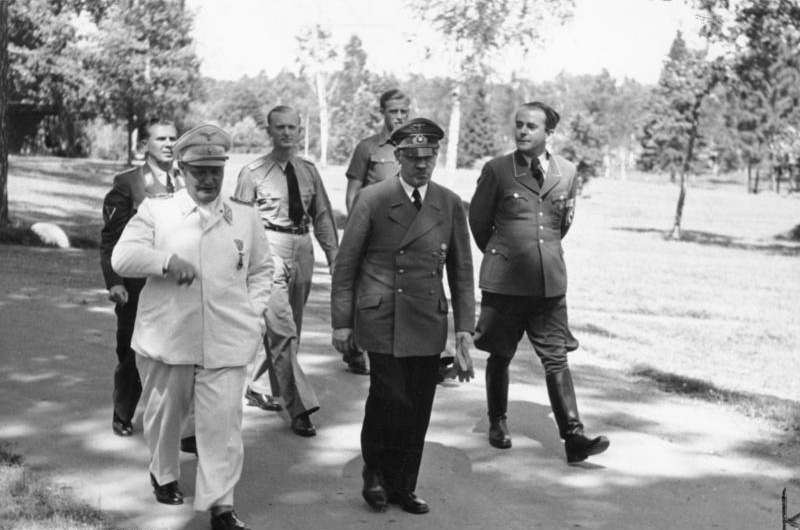
Göring with Hitler and Albert Speer, 10 August 1943

Meanwhile, the strength of the American and British bomber fleets had increased. Based in Britain, they began operations against German targets. The first thousand-bomber raid was staged on Cologne on 30 May 1942. Air raids continued on targets farther from England after auxiliary fuel tanks were installed on US fighter aircraft. Göring refused to believe reports that American fighters had been shot down as far east as Aachen in winter 1942–1943. His reputation began to decline.

The American P-51 Mustang, with a combat radius of over 1,800 miles (2,900 km) when using underwing drop tanks, began to escort the bombers in large formations to and from the target area in early 1944. From that point onwards, the Luftwaffe began to suffer casualties in aircrews it could not sufficiently replace. By targeting oil refineries and rail communications, Allied bombers crippled the German war effort by late 1944. German civilians blamed Göring for his failure to protect the homeland. Hitler began excluding him from conferences but retained him in his positions at the head of the Luftwaffe and as plenipotentiary of the Four-Year Plan. As he lost Hitler's trust, Göring began to spend more time at his various residences. On D-Day (6 June 1944), the Luftwaffe only had some 300 fighters and a small number of bombers in the area of the landings; the Allies had a total strength of 11,000 aircraft.

=== End of the war ===
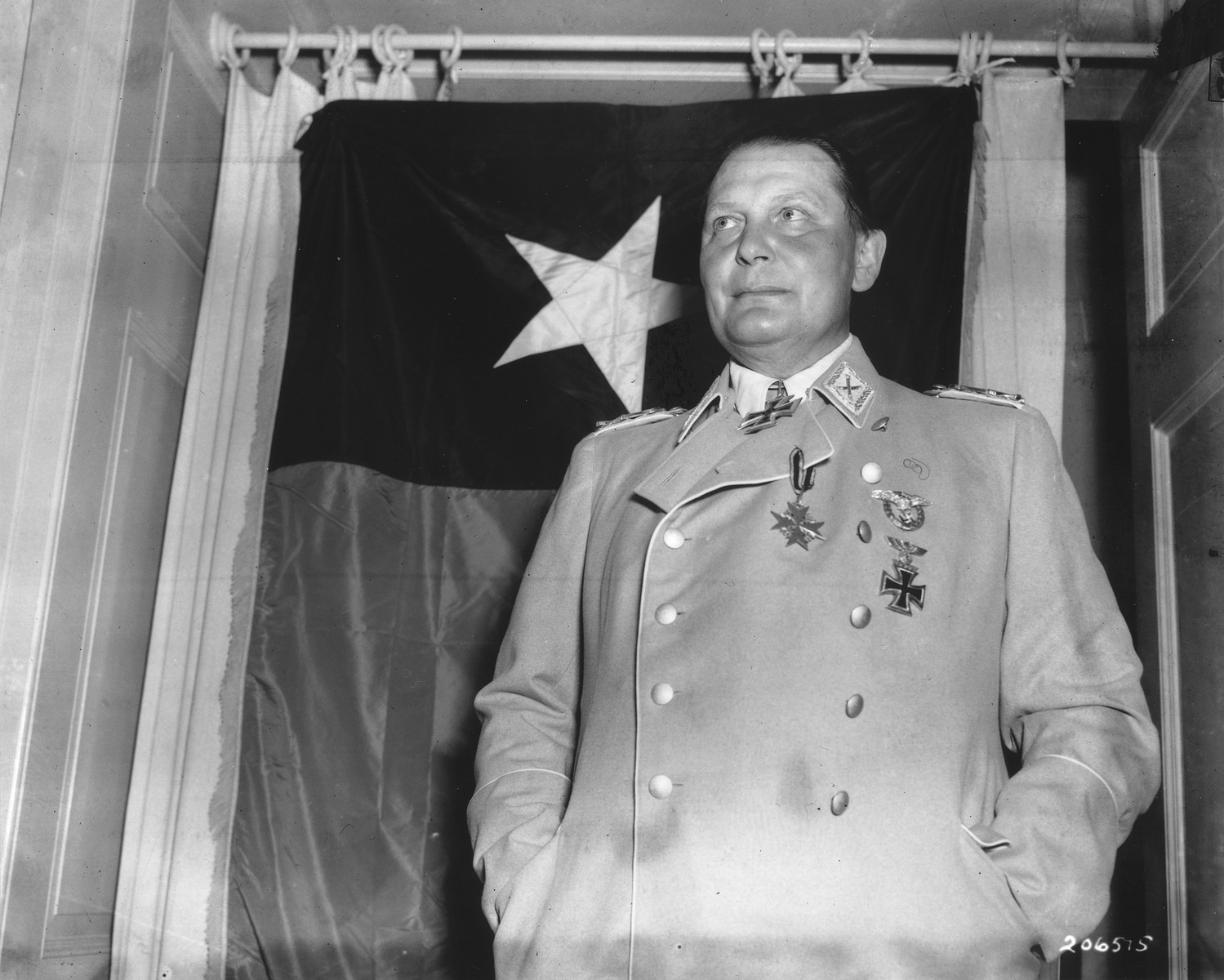
Göring in captivity 9 May 1945

Göring after his capture (15 May 1945)

As the Soviets approached Berlin, Hitler's efforts to organise the defence of the city became ever more meaningless and futile. His last birthday, celebrated at the Führerbunker in Berlin on 20 April 1945, was the occasion for leave-taking by many top Nazis, Göring included. By this time, Göring's hunting lodge Carinhall had been evacuated, the building destroyed, and its art treasures moved to Berchtesgaden and elsewhere. Göring arrived at his estate at Obersalzberg on 22 April, the same day that Hitler, in a lengthy diatribe against his generals, first publicly admitted that the war was lost and that he intended to remain in Berlin to the end and then commit suicide. Göring also stated that he was in a better position to negotiate a peace settlement.

OKW operations chief Alfred Jodl was present for Hitler's rant and notified Göring's chief of staff, Karl Koller, at a meeting a few hours later. Sensing its implications, Koller immediately flew to Berchtesgaden to notify Göring of this development. A week after the start of the Soviet invasion, Hitler had issued a decree naming Göring his successor in the event of his death, thus codifying the declaration he had made soon after the beginning of the war. The decree also gave Göring full authority to act as Hitler's deputy if Hitler ever lost his freedom of action.

Göring feared being branded a traitor if he tried to take power, but also feared being accused of dereliction of duty if he did nothing. After some hesitation, Göring reviewed his copy of the 1941 decree naming him Hitler's successor. After conferring with Koller and Hans Lammers (the state secretary of the Reich Chancellery), Göring concluded that by remaining in Berlin to face certain death, Hitler had incapacitated himself from governing. All agreed that under the terms of the decree, it was incumbent upon Göring to take power in Hitler's stead. He was also motivated by fears that his rival, Martin Bormann, would seize power upon Hitler's death and would have him killed as a traitor. With this in mind, Göring sent a carefully worded telegram asking Hitler for permission to take over as the leader of Germany, stressing that he would be acting as Hitler's deputy. He added that, if Hitler did not reply by 22:00 that night (23 April), he would assume that Hitler had indeed lost his freedom of action and would assume leadership of the Reich.

The telegram was intercepted by Bormann, who convinced Hitler that Göring was attempting a coup. Bormann argued that Göring's telegram was not a request for permission to act as Hitler's deputy, but a demand to resign or be overthrown. Bormann also intercepted another telegram in which Göring directed Ribbentrop to report to him if there was no further communication from Hitler or Göring before midnight. Hitler sent a reply to Göring—prepared with Bormann's help—rescinding the 1941 decree and threatening him with execution for high treason unless he immediately resigned from all of his offices. Realising his situation was untenable, Göring duly resigned. Afterwards, Hitler (or Bormann, depending on the source) ordered the SS to place Göring, his staff and Lammers under house arrest at Obersalzberg. Bormann made an announcement over the radio that Göring had resigned for health reasons.

By 26 April, the complex at Obersalzberg was under attack by the Allies, so Göring was moved to his castle at Mauterndorf. In his last will and testament, Hitler expelled Göring from the party, formally rescinded the decree making him his successor and upbraided Göring for "illegally attempting to seize control of the state". He then appointed Karl Dönitz, the Navy's commander-in-chief, as president of the Reich and supreme commander of the armed forces. Hitler and his wife, Eva Braun, committed suicide on 30 April 1945, a few hours after a hastily arranged wedding. Göring was freed on 5 May by a passing Luftwaffe unit and made his way to the US lines in hopes of surrendering to them rather than to the Soviets. He was taken into custody near Radstadt on 9 May by elements of the 36th Infantry Division of the United States Army. (Note: Upon being captured by American soldiers, Göring immediately asked to be taken before Eisenhower. He hoped to be treated as a "spokesman for Germany".) This move likely saved Göring's life; Bormann had ordered him executed if Berlin had fallen. On 10 May, US Air Forces commander Carl Spaatz, along with Lieutenant General Hoyt Vandenberg and Spaatz's special consultant Bruce Campbell Hopper, conducted an interrogation of Göring at the Ritter School in Augsburg, Germany.

== Trial and death ==
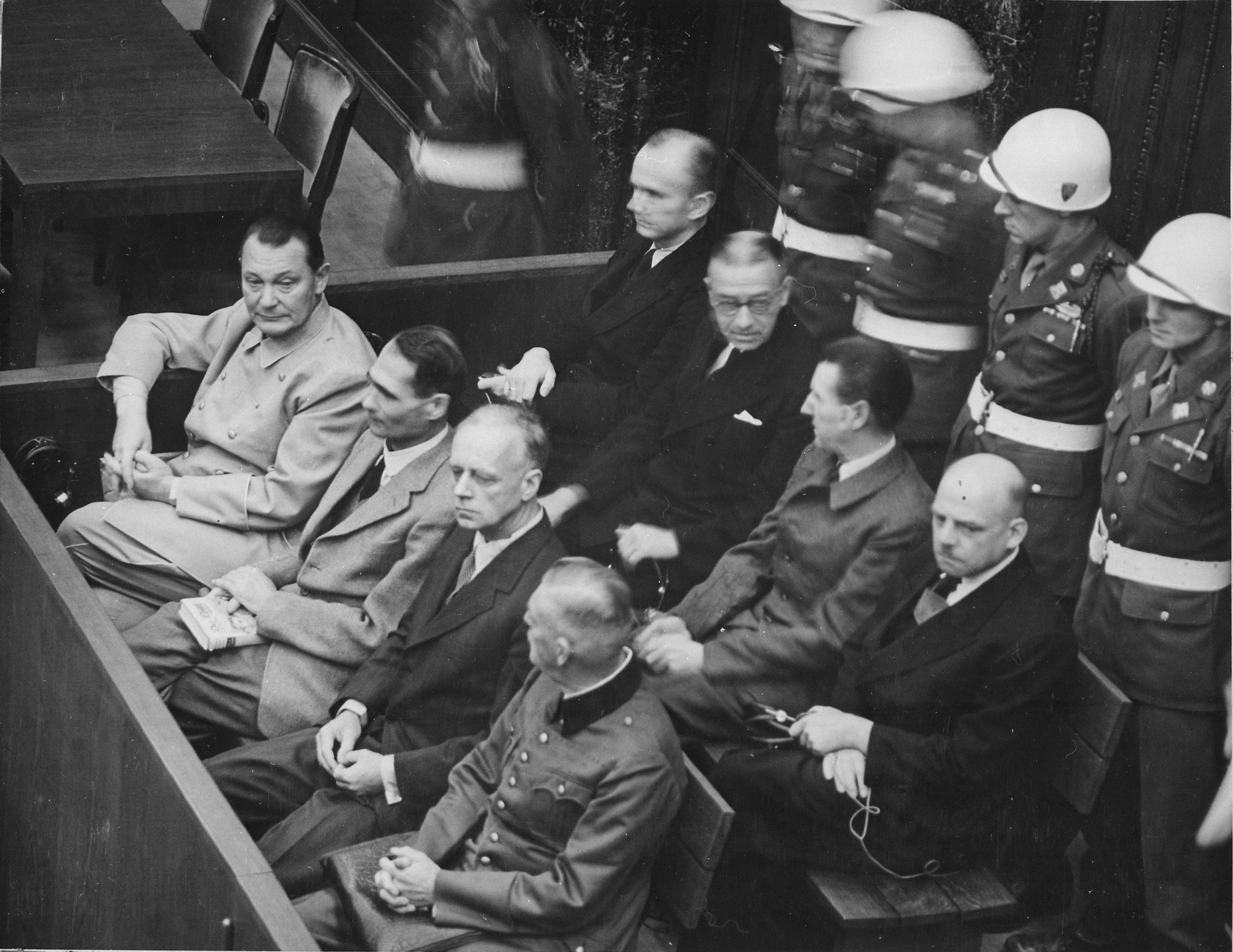
Göring (first row, far left) at the Nuremberg trial

After finding a plane that could hold his 270-pound (120 kg) weight (the first plane, a Piper L-4, could not), Göring was flown to Camp Ashcan, a temporary prisoner-of-war camp housed in the Palace Hotel at Mondorf-les-Bains, Luxembourg. Here he was weaned off dihydrocodeine (a mild morphine derivative) — he had been taking the equivalent of three or four grains (260 to 320 mg) of morphine a day – and was put on a strict diet; he lost 60 pounds (27 kg). His IQ was tested while in custody and found to be 138. Top Nazi officials were transferred in September to Nuremberg, which was to be the location of a series of military tribunals beginning in November. At Nuremberg, Göring was examined by Chief Medical Officer Lt. Col. Rene Juchli, who reported that Göring was "still suffering from heart disease and excess fat, both due to glandular disturbance."

Göring was the second highest-ranking official tried at Nuremberg, behind Reich President (former Admiral) Karl Dönitz. The prosecution levelled an indictment of four charges, including a charge of conspiracy; waging a war of aggression; war crimes, including the plundering and removal to Germany of works of art and other property; and crimes against humanity, including the disappearance of political and other opponents under the Nacht und Nebel (transl. Night and Fog) decree; the torture and ill treatment of prisoners of war; and the murder and enslavement of civilians, including what was at the time estimated to be 5,700,000 Jews. When asked for his plea, Göring attempted to read a lengthy statement to the court, but was rebuked by presiding judge Sir Geoffrey Lawrence and instructed to simply plead either "guilty" or "not guilty"; Göring then declared himself to be "in the sense of the indictment, not guilty".

The trial lasted 218 days. The prosecution presented its case from November to March, and Göring's defence—the first to be presented—lasted from 8 to 22 March. The sentences were read on 30 September 1946. Göring, forced to remain silent while seated in the dock, communicated his opinions about the proceedings using gestures, shaking his head, or laughing. He constantly took notes, whispered with the other defendants and tried to control the erratic behaviour of Hess, who was seated beside him. During breaks in the proceedings, Göring tried to dominate the other defendants, and he was eventually placed in solitary confinement when he attempted to influence their testimony. Göring told American psychiatrist Leon Goldensohn that the court was "stupid" to try "little fellows" like Funk and Kaltenbrunner instead of letting Göring take all the blame on himself. He also claimed that he had never heard of most of the other defendants before the trial.

On several occasions over the course of the trial, the prosecution showed films of the concentration camps and other atrocities. Everyone present, including Göring, found the contents of the films shocking; he said that the films must have been faked. Witnesses, including Paul Körner and Erhard Milch, tried to portray Göring as a peaceful moderate. Milch stated that it had been impossible to oppose Hitler or disobey his orders; to do so would likely have meant death for oneself and one's family. When testifying on his own behalf, Göring emphasised his loyalty to Hitler and claimed to know nothing about what had happened in the concentration camps, which were under Himmler's control. He provided evasive, convoluted answers to direct questions and had plausible excuses for all of his actions during the war. He used the witness stand as a venue to expound at great length on his own role in the Reich, attempting to present himself as a peacemaker and diplomat before the outbreak of the war. During cross-examination, chief prosecutor Robert H. Jackson read the minutes of a meeting that had been held shortly after Kristallnacht, a major pogrom in November 1938. At the meeting, Göring had plotted to confiscate Jewish property in the wake of the pogrom. Later, David Maxwell-Fyfe presented evidence that Göring must have known about the killing of 50 airmen who had been recaptured after escaping from Stalag Luft III and could have saved them. He also presented evidence that Göring knew about the extermination of the Hungarian Jews.

Göring was found guilty on all four counts and was sentenced to death by hanging. The judgement stated:

There is nothing to be said in mitigation. For Göring was often, indeed almost always, the moving force, second only to his leader. He was the leading war aggressor, both as a political and as a military leader; he was the director of the slave labour programme and the creator of the oppressive programme against the Jews and other races, at home and abroad. All of these crimes he has frankly admitted. In some specific cases, there may be a conflict of testimony, but in terms of the broad outline, his own admissions are more than sufficiently wide to be conclusive of his guilt. His guilt is unique in its enormity. The record discloses no excuses for this man.

Göring made an appeal asking to be shot as a soldier instead of hanged as a common criminal, but the court refused.

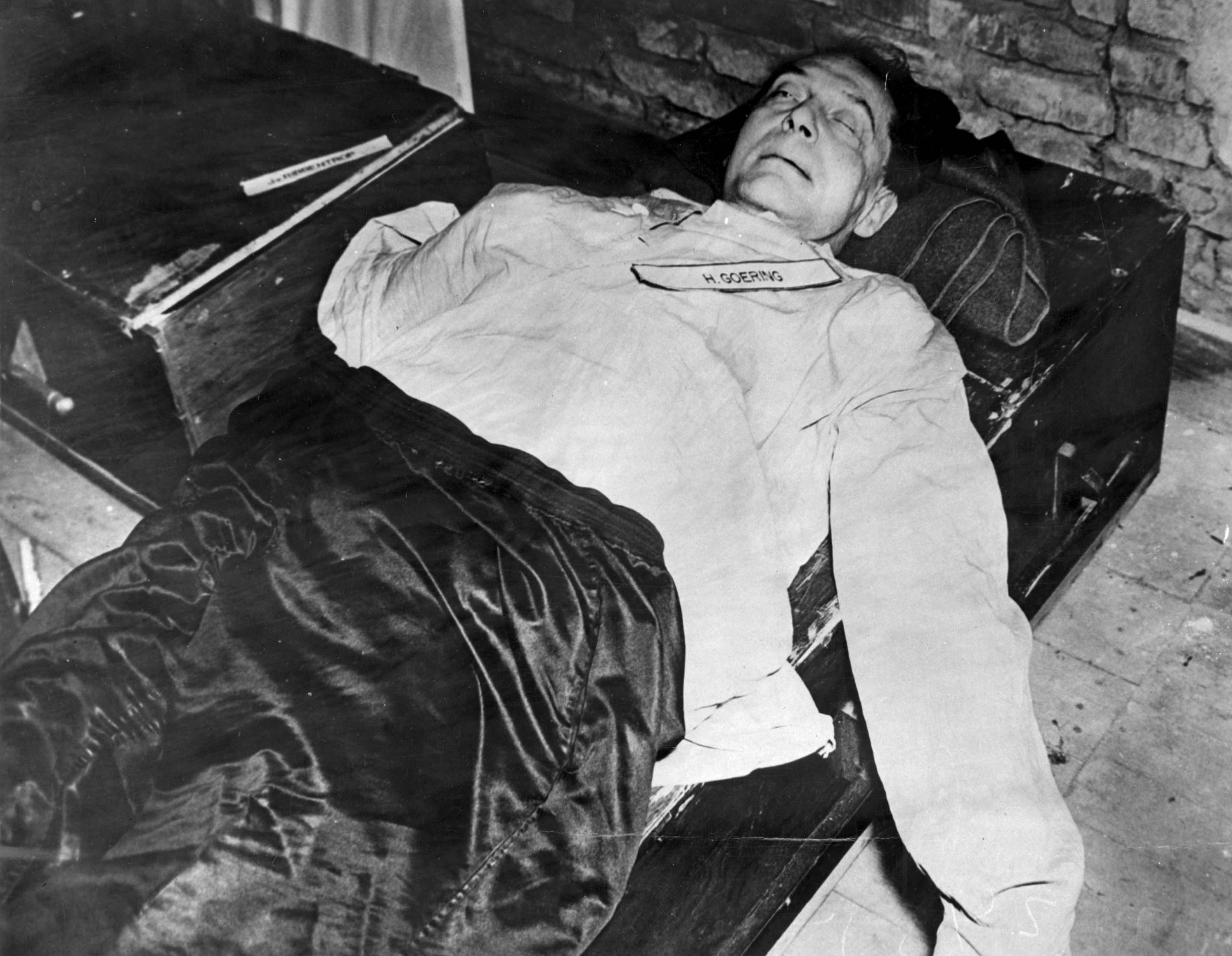
Göring's corpse

The night before he was to be hanged, however, Göring committed suicide with a potassium cyanide capsule. He had asked for Lutheran last rites before that, but that had been refused. His death was slow and painful; as the guards peered into his cell shortly before the execution, they saw him twisting in convulsions. A doctor was quickly summoned, but Göring was dead within five minutes.

Since he was guarded around the clock, it was not clear how Göring obtained the poison. In his suicide note, Göring claimed to have possessed the capsule since he was imprisoned. (Note: Göring's suicide note read as follows: To the Commandant: I have always held the capsule of poison with me from the time that I became a prisoner. When taken to Mondorf I had three capsules. The first I left in my clothes so that it would be found when a search was made. The second I placed under the clothes-rack on undressing and took it to me again on dressing. I hid this in Mondorf and here in the cell so well that despite their frequent and thorough searches it could not be found. During the court sessions I hid it on my person and in my high riding boots. The third capsule is still in my small suitcase in the round box of skin cream, hidden in the cream. I could have taken this to me twice in Mondorf if I had needed it. None of those charged with searching is to be blamed, for it was practically impossible to find the capsule. It would have been pure accident. Dr. Gilbert informed me that the control board has refused the petition to change the method of execution to shooting. — Hermann W. Göring) At the time, speculation centred on whether he had access to a jar of his hair cream where another cyanide capsule was later found. Decades later, another theory focused on a US Army lieutenant, Jack G. Wheelis, who had been stationed at the trials but who had since died. Göring had given Wheelis his gold watch, pen and cigarette case, and so it was theorised that Wheelis had retrieved the capsules from their hiding place among Göring's confiscated personal effects and then passed them along.

In 2005, former US Army private Herbert Lee Stivers, who served in the 1st Infantry Division's 26th Infantry Regiment — the honour guard for the Nuremberg Trials – claimed he gave Göring "medicine" hidden inside a fountain pen that a young German woman, Mona, had asked him to smuggle into the prison. In explaining his decision to speak out 60 years later, Stivers said that he was convinced to come forward by his daughter. He wanted to set the record straight: he thought that he was just offering medicine; he said that he did not know what was in the pill until after Göring's suicide.

Douglas Kelley, who had been the chief psychiatrist responsible for the prisoners at Nuremberg before being replaced by Leon Goldensohn, called Göring's suicide "an admirably defiant act against the Nuremberg prison authorities." (Note: Years later, Kelley, a violent alcoholic who had often threatened suicide, killed himself during an outburst in front of his family using the same method as Göring.)

Göring's body, as with those of the ten men who were executed, was displayed at the execution ground for witnesses. The bodies were cremated at Ostfriedhof, Munich, and the ashes scattered in the Isar River.

== Personal properties ==
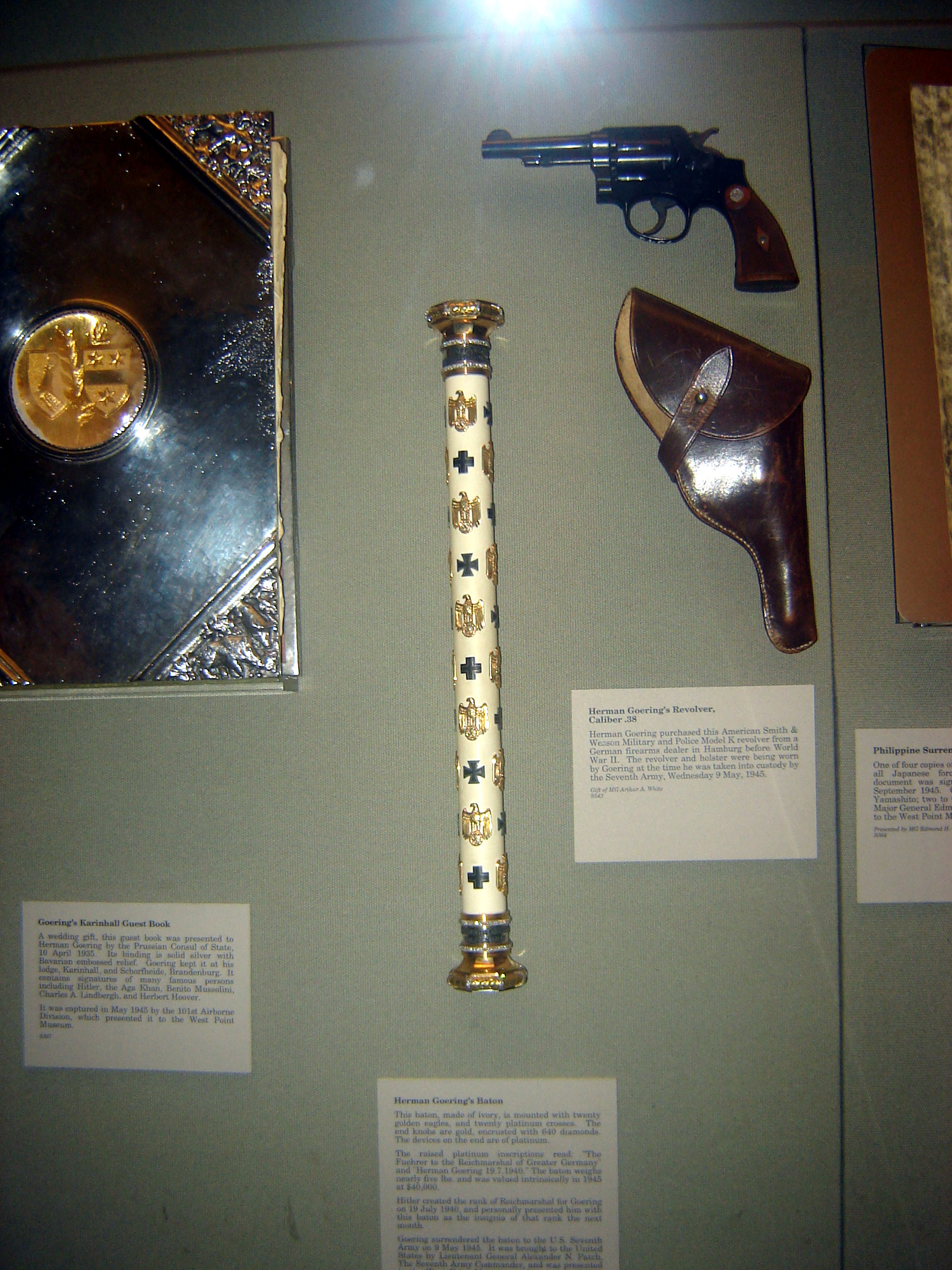
Göring's Reichsmarschall baton and Smith & Wesson Model 10 revolver. To the left is the silver-bound guest book from Carinhall (West Point Museum).

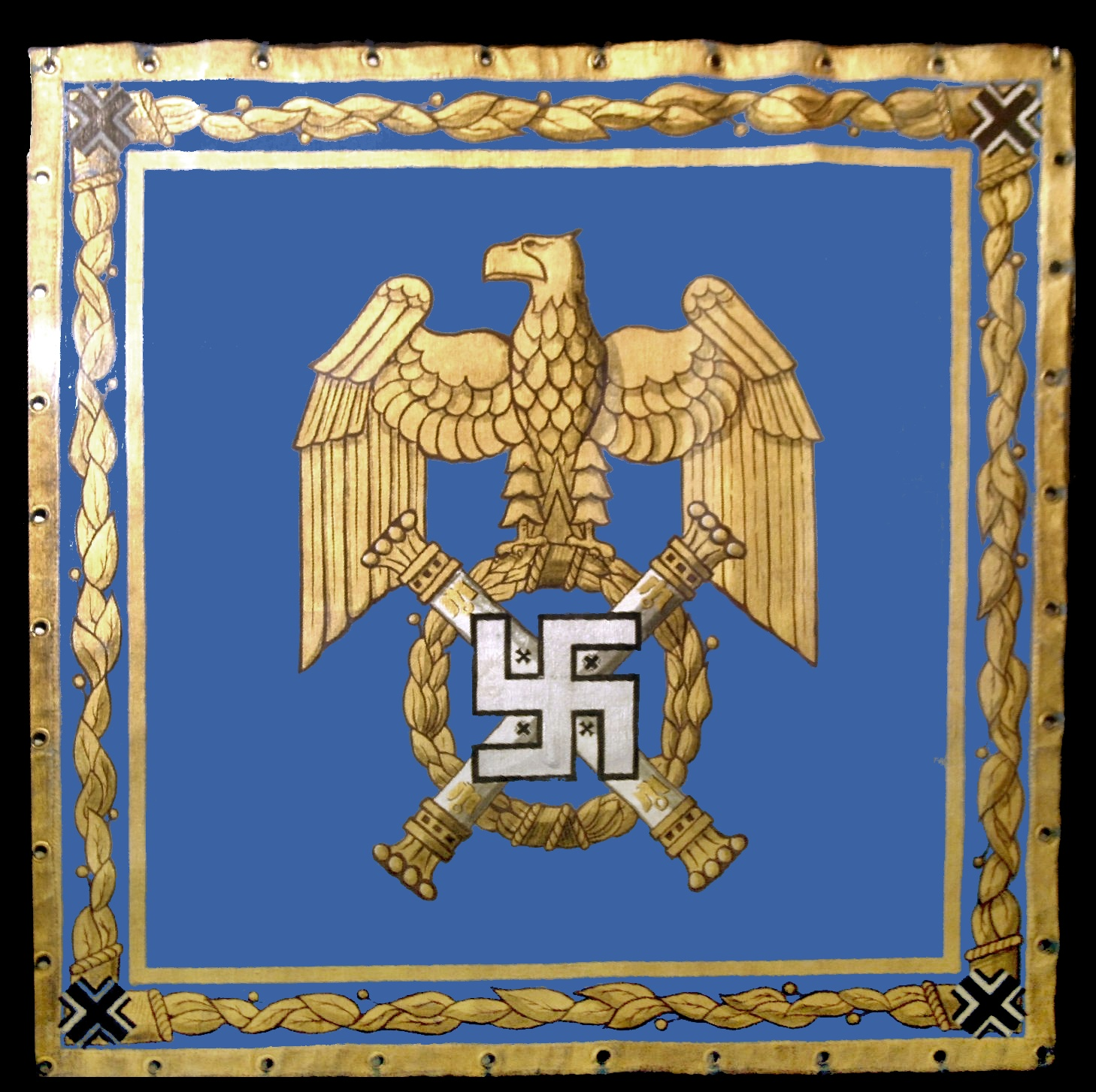
Standard, on display at the Musée de la Guerre in Les Invalides, Paris

Göring's name is closely associated with the Nazi plunder of Jewish property. His name appears 135 times on the OSS Art Looting Investigation Unit (ALIU) Red Flag Names List compiled by US Army intelligence in 1945–46 and declassified in 1997.

The confiscation of Jewish property gave Göring the opportunity to amass a personal fortune. Some properties he seized himself or acquired for a nominal price. In other cases, he collected bribes for allowing others to steal Jewish property. He took kickbacks from industrialists for favourable decisions as Four-Year Plan director and money for supplying arms to the Spanish Republicans in the Spanish Civil War via Pyrkal in Greece (although Germany was supporting Franco and the Nationalists).

Göring was appointed Reich Master of the Hunt in 1933 and Master of the German Forests in 1934. He instituted reforms to the forestry laws and acted to protect endangered species. Around this time, he became interested in Schorfheide Forest, where he set aside 100,000 acres (400 km^{2}) as a state park, which is still extant. There he built an elaborate hunting lodge, Carinhall, in memory of his first wife, Carin. By 1934, her body had been transported to the site and placed in a vault on the estate. Through most of the 1930s, Göring kept pet lion cubs, borrowed from the Berlin Zoo, both at Carinhall and at his house at Obersalzberg. The main lodge at Carinhall had a large art gallery where Göring displayed works that had been plundered from private collections and museums around Europe from 1939 onward. Göring worked closely with the Einsatzstab Reichsleiter Rosenberg (transl. Reichsleiter Rosenberg Taskforce), an organisation tasked with the looting of artwork and cultural material from Jewish collections, libraries and museums throughout Europe. Headed by Alfred Rosenberg, the task force set up a collection centre and headquarters in Paris. Some 26,000 railroad cars full of art treasures, furniture and other looted items were sent to Germany from France alone. Göring repeatedly visited the Paris headquarters to review the incoming stolen goods and to select items to be sent on a special train to Carinhall and his other homes. The estimated value of his collection, which numbered some 1,500 pieces, was $200 million.

Göring owned a number of small boats. In 1935 the German Association of the Automotive Industry gifted him a 16-meter motor yacht that he named Carin after his deceased wife. Enjoying this ship, he requested a larger, more seaworthy one. The association obliged. The Carin II, a 27.5-meter motor yacht, was launched on 27 June 1937. Göring used it for recreational as well as representative and business activities until the end of the war.

Göring was known for his extravagant tastes and garish clothing. He had various special uniforms made for the many posts he held; his Reichsmarschall uniform included a jewel-encrusted baton. Hans-Ulrich Rudel, the top Stuka pilot of the war, recalled twice meeting Göring dressed in outlandish costumes: first, a medieval hunting costume, practising archery with his doctor; and second, dressed in a red toga fastened with a golden clasp, smoking an unusually large pipe. Italian Foreign Minister Galeazzo Ciano once noted Göring wearing a fur coat that looked like what "a high-grade prostitute wears to the opera". He threw lavish housewarming parties each time a round of construction was completed at Carinhall and changed costumes several times throughout the evenings.

Göring was noted for his patronage of music, especially opera. He entertained frequently and sumptuously and hosted elaborate birthday parties for himself. Armaments minister Albert Speer recalled that guests brought expensive gifts, such as gold bars, Dutch cigars and valuable artwork. For his birthday in 1944, Speer gave Göring an oversized marble bust of Hitler. As a member of the Prussian Council of State, Speer was required to donate a considerable portion of his salary towards the council's birthday gift to Göring without even being asked. Generalfeldmarschall Milch told Speer that similar donations were required out of the Air Ministry's general fund. For his birthday in 1940, Ciano decorated Göring with the coveted Collar of Annunziata. The award reduced him to tears.

The design of the Reichsmarschall standard, on a light blue field, featured a gold German eagle grasping a wreath surmounted by two batons overlaid with a swastika. The reverse side of the flag had the Großkreuz des Eisernen Kreuzes (transl. Grand Cross of the Iron Cross) surrounded by a wreath between four Luftwaffe eagles. The flag was carried by a personal standard-bearer at all public occasions.

Though he liked to be called "der Eiserne" (transl. the Iron Man), the former fighter pilot had become corpulent. He was one of the few Nazi leaders who did not take offence at hearing jokes about himself, "no matter how rude", taking them as a sign of his popularity among the masses. One such German joke poked fun at Göring by stating that he would wear an admiral's uniform with rubber medals to take a bath. His obesity was also a target, it being joked that "he sits down on his stomach". Another joke claimed that he had sent a wire to Hitler after his visit to the Vatican: "Mission accomplished. Pope unfrocked. Tiara and pontifical vestments are a perfect fit."

== Role in the Holocaust ==
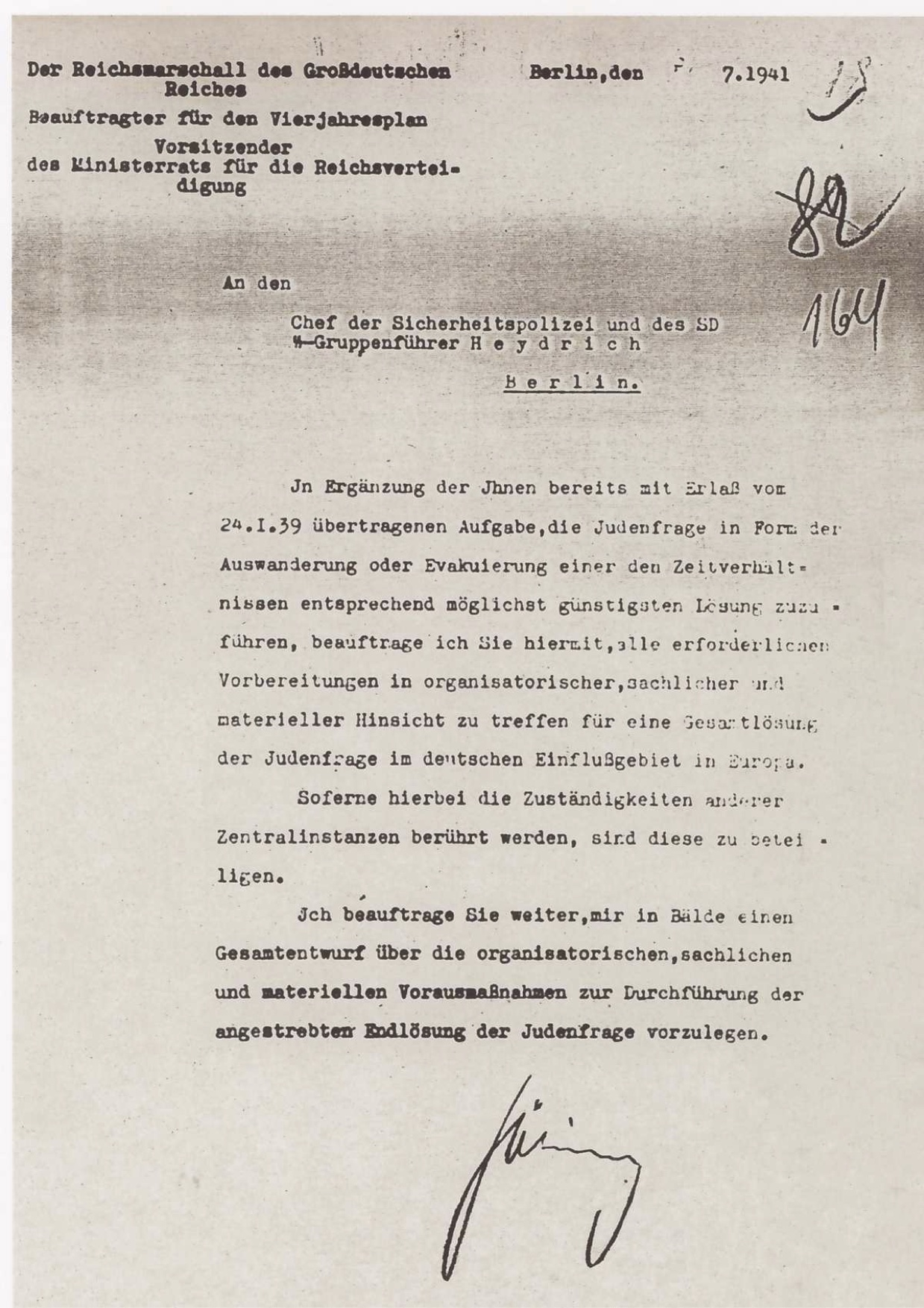
Göring's July 1941 letter to Reinhard Heydrich

Joseph Goebbels and Heinrich Himmler were far more antisemitic than Göring, who mainly adopted that attitude because party politics required him to do so. His deputy Erhard Milch had a Jewish parent. However, Göring supported the Nuremberg Laws of 1935 and later initiated economic measures unfavourable to Jews. He required the registration of all Jewish property as part of the Four-Year Plan, and at a meeting held after Kristallnacht was livid that the financial burden for the Jewish losses would have to be made good by German-owned insurance companies. He proposed that the Jews be fined one billion marks.

At the same meeting, options for the disposition of the Jews and their property were discussed. Jews would be segregated into ghettos or encouraged to emigrate, and their property would be seized in a programme of Aryanisation. Compensation for seized property would be low, if any was given at all. Detailed minutes of this meeting and other documents were read out at the Nuremberg trial, proving his knowledge of and complicity with the persecution of the Jews.

On 24 January 1939, Göring established in Berlin the head office of the Central Office for Jewish Emigration, modelled on the similar organisation established in Vienna in August 1938. Under the direction of Heydrich, it was tasked with using any means necessary to prompt Jews to leave the Reich, and with creating a Jewish organisation that would co-ordinate emigration from the Jewish side.

In July 1941, Göring issued a memo to Heydrich ordering him to organise the practical details of the Final Solution to the "Jewish Question". By the time that this letter was written, many Jews and others had already been killed in Poland, Russia and elsewhere. At the Wannsee Conference, held six months later, Heydrich formally announced that genocide of the Jews was now official Reich policy. Göring did not attend the conference, but he was present at other meetings where the number of people killed was discussed.

Göring directed anti-partisan operations by Luftwaffe security battalions in the Białowieża Forest between 1942 and 1944 that resulted in the murder of thousands of Jews and Polish civilians.

At the Nuremberg trial, Göring told first lieutenant and US Army psychologist Gustave Gilbert that he would never have supported the anti-Jewish measures if he had known what was going to happen. "I only thought we would eliminate Jews from positions in big business and government", he claimed.

== Decorations and awards ==
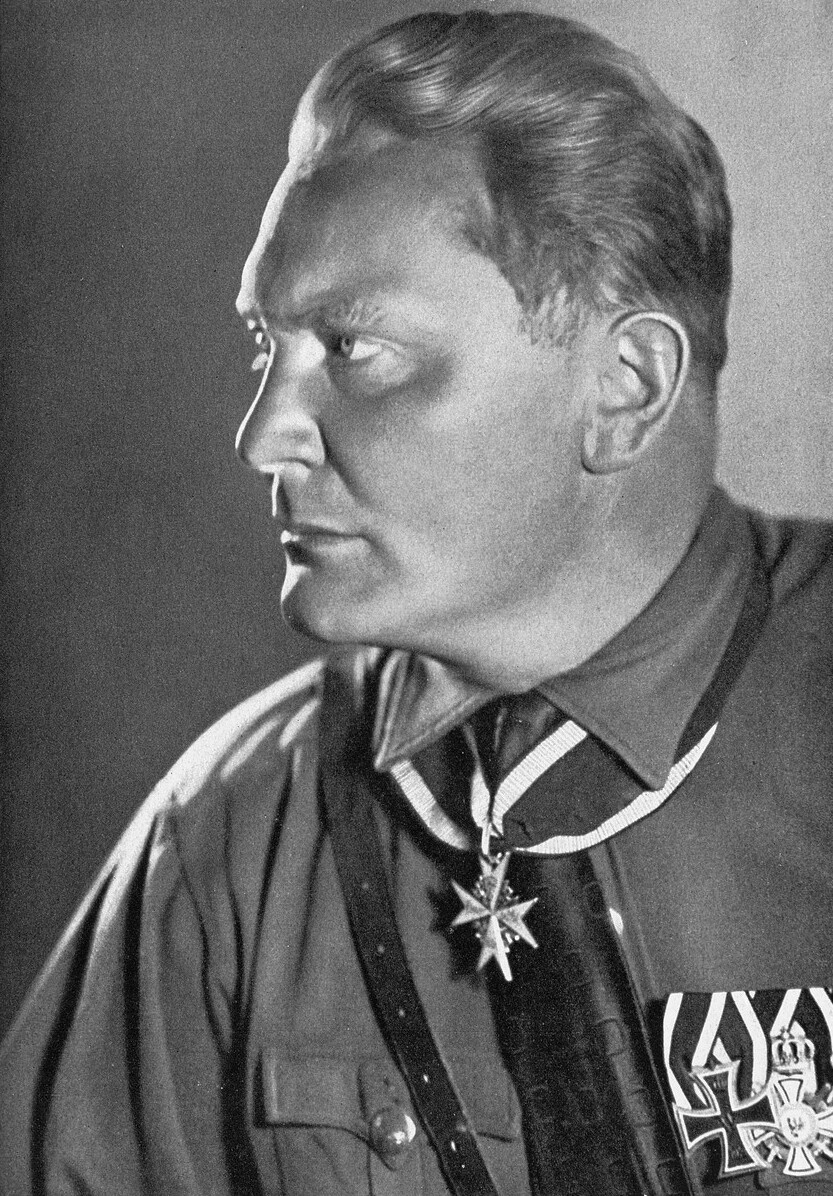
Göring wearing his Pour le Mérite medal (1932)

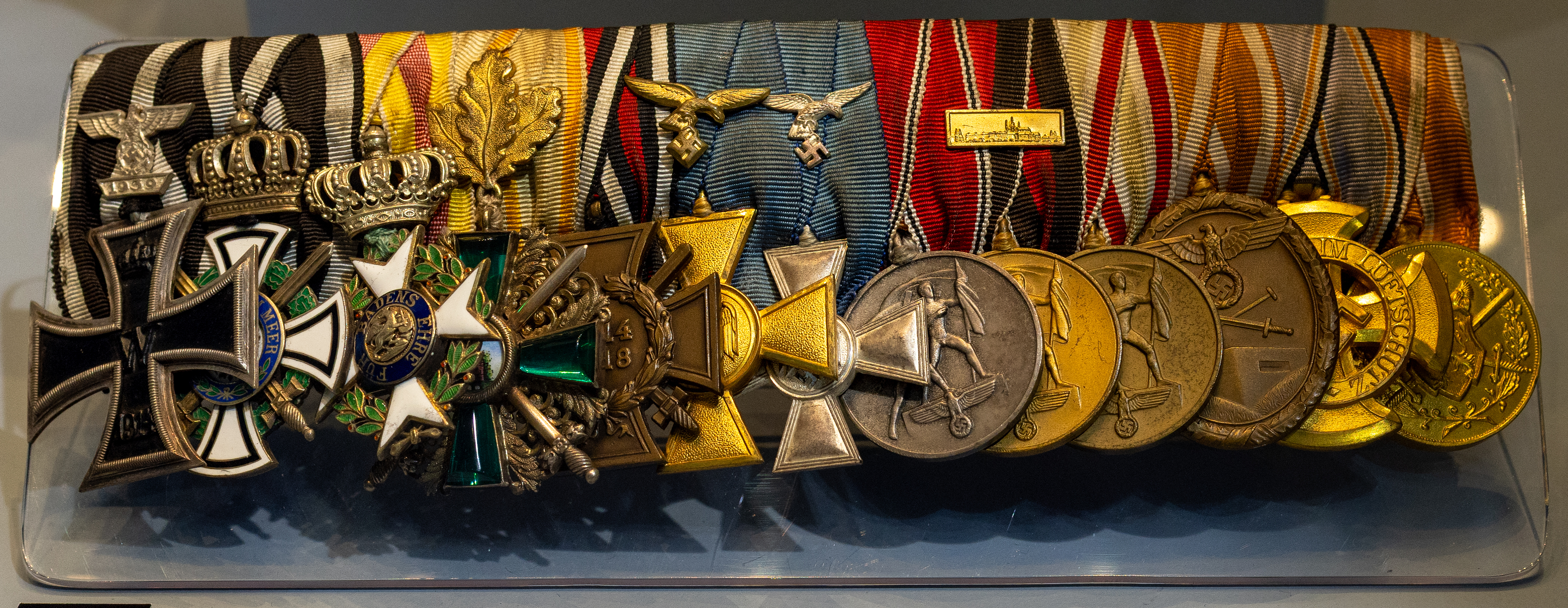
Göring's medal bar displayed at the Royal Air Force Museum London

=== German ===
- Kingdom of Prussia:
  - Iron Cross 2nd Class (15 September 1914)
  - Iron Cross 1st Class (22 March 1915)
  - Royal House Order of Hohenzollern, Knights Cross with Swords
  - Order Pour le Mérite (2 June 1918)
- Grand Duchy of Baden:
  - Military Karl-Friedrich Merit Order, Knights Cross
  - Order of the Zähringer Lion, Knights Cross 2nd Class with Swords
- Nazi Germany:
  - 1939 Clasp to the Iron Cross 2nd Class (30 September 1939)
  - 1939 Clasp to the Iron Cross 1st Class (30 September 1939)
  - Knight's Cross of the Iron Cross (30 September 1939)
  - Grand Cross of the Iron Cross for "the victories of the Luftwaffe in 1940 during the French campaign" (the only award of this decoration during World War II – 19 August 1940)
  - Golden Party Badge
  - Blood Order (Commemorative Medal of 9 November 1923)
  - Danzig Cross, 1st and 2nd class

=== Foreign ===
- Kingdom of Bulgaria: Order of Saints Cyril and Methodius, Knight
- Kingdom of Denmark: Order of the Dannebrog, Grand Cross with Breast Star in Diamonds (25 July 1938)
- Finland:
  - Order of the White Rose of Finland
    - Grand Cross (6 March 1935)
    - Grand Cross with Collar (21 April 1941)
  - Order of the Cross of Liberty, Grand Cross with Swords (25 March 1942)
- Kingdom of Hungary: Order of St Stephen, Grand Cross
- Kingdom of Italy:
  - Grand Cross of the Order of Saints Maurice and Lazarus (26 May 1933)
  - Knight of the Supreme Order of the Most Holy Annunciation (12 January 1940)
  - Grand Cross of the Military Order of Savoy (27 November 1941)
  - Grand Cross of the Military Order of the Roman Eagle (10 January 1943)
- Kingdom of Romania: Order of Michael the Brave, 1st class (14 October 1941) (Note: Evidence for this award is allegedly found in Royal Decree No. 2,868, published in Official Gazette, year CIX, no 249 of 20 October 1941, part 1a, p.6,247)
- Kingdom of Sweden: Order of the Sword Commander Grand Cross with Collar (1939)
- Empire of Japan: Order of the Rising Sun, Grand Cordon with Paulownia Flowers (4 October 1943)

== See also ==
- Aerial victory standards of World War I
- Air warfare of World War II
- Fallschirm-Panzer Division 1 Hermann Göring – German elite Luftwaffe armoured division
- Glossary of German military terms
- Glossary of Nazi Germany
- Göring's Green Folder – 1941 Nazi policy document
- List of Nazi Party leaders and officials
- List of streets named after Hermann Göring

== Bibliography ==
- "Art Provenance and Claims Records and Research". National Archives and Records Administration. 15 August 2016.
- Beevor, Antony (2006). The Battle for Spain: The Spanish Civil War 1936–1939. London: Phoenix. ISBN 978-0-7538-2165-7.
- Bille-Hansen, A. C.; Holck, Harald, eds. (1943). Statshaandbog for Kongeriget Danmark for Aaret 1943 [State Manual of the Kingdom of Denmark for the Year 1943] (PDF). Kongelig Dansk Hof- og Statskalender (in Danish). Copenhagen: J. H. Schultz A.-S. Universitetsbogtrykkeri – via da:DIS Danmark.
- Block, Maxine; Trow, E. Mary (1971). Current Biography: Who's News and Why 1941. New York: H. W. Wilson Company. OCLC 16655369.
- Blood, Philip W. (2001). Holmes, E. R. (ed.). Bandenbekämpfung: Nazi occupation security in Eastern Europe and Soviet Russia 1942–1945 (PhD thesis). Cranfield University.
- Blood, Philip W. (3 August 2010). "Securing Hitler's Lebensraum: The Luftwaffe and Bialowieza Forest, 1942–1944". Holocaust and Genocide Studies. 24 (2): 247–272. doi:10.1093/hgs/dcq024. ISSN 1476-7937.
- Botting, Douglas (2006). In the Ruins of The Reich: Germany 1945–1949. London: Methuen Publishing. ISBN 978-0-413-77511-5.
- Broszat, Martin (1981). The Hitler State: The Foundation and Development of the Internal Structure of the Third Reich. New York: Longman. ISBN 0-582-49200-9.
- Bullock, Alan (1999) [1952]. Hitler: A Study in Tyranny. New York: Konecky & Konecky. ISBN 978-1-56852-036-0.
- Bungay, Stephen (2000). The Most Dangerous Enemy: A History of the Battle of Britain. London: Aurum Press. ISBN 978-1-85410-721-3.
- Cesarani, David (2005) [2004]. Eichmann: His Life and Crimes. London: Vintage. ISBN 978-0-09-944844-0.
- Childers, Thomas (2017). The Third Reich: A History of Nazi Germany. New York: Simon & Schuster. ISBN 978-1-45165-113-3.
- Darnstädt, Thomas (4 April 2005). "Ein Glücksfall der Geschichte". Der Spiegel.
- "Datenbank der deutschen Parlamentsabgeordneten. Basis: Parlamentsalmanache/Reichstagshandbücher 1867–1938". reichstag-abgeordnetendatenbank.de.
- El-Hai, Jack (2013). The Nazi and the Psychiatrist: Hermann Göring, Dr. Douglas M. Kelley, and a Fatal Meeting of Minds at the End of WWII. New York: PublicAffairs. ISBN 978-1-61039-463-5.
- Evans, Richard J. (2003). The Coming of the Third Reich. New York: Penguin. ISBN 978-0-14-303469-8.
- Evans, Richard J. (2005). The Third Reich in Power. New York: Penguin. ISBN 978-0-14-303790-3.
- Evans, Richard J. (2008). The Third Reich at War. New York: Penguin. ISBN 978-0-14-311671-4.
- Evans, Richard J. (2024). Hitler's People: The Faces of the Third Reich. New York: Penguin. ISBN 978-0-59329-643-1.
- Fellgiebel, Walther-Peer (2000) [1986]. Die Träger des Ritterkreuzes des Eisernen Kreuzes, 1939–1945 (in German). Friedberg: Podzun-Pallas. ISBN 978-3-7909-0284-6.
- Fleming, Thomas (December 1987). "The Big Leak". American Heritage. 38 (8). Archived from the original on 14 February 2008.
- "Forgetfulness Of Hess Held Intentional". Vallejo Times-Herald. Luther Gibson. 18 October 1945. p. 7.
- Frank, Hans, ed. (1933–1934). Jahrbuch der Akademie für Deutsches Recht [Yearbook of the Academy for German Law]. München/Berlin/Leipzig: Schweitzer Verlag.
- Franks, Norman L. R.; Bailey, Frank W.; Guest, Russell (1993). Above the Lines: The Aces and Fighter Units of the German Air Service, Naval Air Service and Flanders Marine Corps 1914–1918. London: Grub Street. ISBN 978-0-948817-73-1.
- Franks, Norman; Van Wyngarden, Greg (2003). Fokker D VII Aces of World War 1: Part 1. Oxford: Osprey. ISBN 1-84176-533-3.
- Freitag, Christian H. (2015). Ritter, Reichsmarschall & Revoluzzer. Aus der Geschichte eines Berliner Landhauses (in German). Berlin: Friedenauer Brücke. ISBN 978-3-9816130-2-5.
- Fussell, Paul (2002). Uniforms: Why We Are What We Wear. New York: Houghton Mifflin. ISBN 978-0-618-38188-3.
- Gade, Ida K. Richter (21 February 2011). "Herman Göring". berlingske.dk (in Danish). Berlingske Media A/S.
- "Odznaczenie japońskie dla marsz. Goeringa" (PDF). Gazeta Lwowska (in Polish). No. 233. 5 October 1943. p. 1.
- Gerlach, Christian (2016). The Extermination of the European Jews. Cambridge University Press. ISBN 978-0-521-70689-6.
- Gerwarth, Robert (2011). Hitler's Hangman: The Life of Heydrich. New Haven, CT: Yale University Press. ISBN 978-0-300-11575-8.
- Gilbert, Gustave (1995). Nuremberg Diary. New York: Da Capo Press. ISBN 978-0-306-80661-2.
- Goldensohn, Leon N. (2004). The Nuremberg Interviews: Conversations with the Defendants and Witnesses. New York: Alfred A. Knopf. ISBN 978-0-375-41469-5.
- Goldhagen, Daniel (1996). Hitler's Willing Executioners: Ordinary Germans and the Holocaust. New York: Knopf. ISBN 978-0-679-44695-8.
- "Guard "gave Goering suicide pill"". BBC News. 8 February 2005.
- Gunther, John (1940). Inside Europe. New York: Harper & Brothers. OCLC 836676034.
- Harvard Law School, ed. (20 December 1946). "Transcript for NMT 2: Milch Case — Indictment". Nuremberg Trials Project. Harvard Law School Library.
- Hett, Benjamin Carter (2014). Burning the Reichstag: An Investigation into the Third Reich's Enduring Mystery. Oxford: Oxford University Press. ISBN 9780199322329.
- Hilberg, Raul (1985). The Destruction of the European Jews. New York: Holmes & Meier. ISBN 0-8419-0910-5.
- Hitler, Adolf (1988). Hitler's Table Talk, 1941–1944. Oxford; New York: Oxford University Press. ISBN 978-0-19-285180-2.
- Holland, James (2011). The Battle of Britain: Five Months That Changed History; May-October 1940. New York: St. Martin's Press. ISBN 978-0-31-267500-4.
- Hooton, Edward (1999). Phoenix Triumphant: The Rise and Rise of the Luftwaffe. Garden City, NJ: Arms & Armour Press. ISBN 1-85409-181-6.
- "Judgment of International Military Tribunal on Hermann Goering". The Avalon Project. New Haven, Connecticut: Yale Law School, Lillian Goldman Law Library. 30 September 1946.
- Keller, Rolf [in German] (2021). ""[...] A necessary evil": use of Soviet prisoners of war as labourers in the German Reich, 1941–1945". Dimensionen eines Verbrechens: Sowjetische Kriegsgefangene im Zweiten Weltkrieg [Dimensions of a Crime. Soviet Prisoners of War in World War II] (in German and English). Metropol Verlag. pp. 194–205. ISBN 978-3-86331-582-5.
- Kellerhoff, Sven Felix (23 March 2018). "Raubkunst: Für Löwen hatte Hermann Göring eine Schwäche". Die Welt (in German).
- Kershaw, Ian (2008). Hitler: A Biography. New York: W. W. Norton & Company. ISBN 978-0-393-06757-6.
- Kilduff, Peter (2013). Herman Göring, Fighter Ace: The World War I Career of Germany's Most Infamous Airman. London: Grub Street. ISBN 978-1-906502-66-9.
- Knopf, Volker; Martens, Stefan (2012). Görings Reich: Selbstinszenierungen in Carinhall (in German). Berlin: Ch. Links Verlag. ISBN 978-3-86153-392-4.
- Kube, Alfred (1987). Pour le mérite und Hakenkreuz: Hermann Göring im Dritten Reich [Pour le Mérite and Swastika: Hermann Göring in the Third Reich] (in German) (2 ed.). Munich: Oldenbourg. p. 341. ISBN 3-486-53122-0.
- "Kungl. Svenska Riddarordnarna". Bihang till Sveriges Statskalender 1940 (in Swedish). Uppsala: Almqvist & Wiksells Boktryckeri. 1940.
- Lajos, Pallos (2011). "A Magyar Királyi Szent István Rend jelvényei a Magyar Nemzeti Múzeum Éremtárában". In Tibor, Kovács (ed.). 2010–2011 A Magyar Nemzeti Múzeum történeti évkönyve. Folia Historica: Magyar Nemzeti Múzeum Évkönyve (in Hungarian). Budapest: Hungarian National Museum. pp. 39–65. ISSN 0133-6622.
- Lepage, Jean-Denis (2016). Hitler's Stormtroopers: The SA, The Nazi's Brownshirts, 1922–1945. Frontline Books. ISBN 978-1-399-07721-7.
- Lilla, Joachim (2005). Der Preußische Staatsrat 1921–1933: Ein biographisches Handbuch. Düsseldorf: Droste Verlag. ISBN 978-3-770-05271-4.
- Manvell, Roger; Fraenkel, Heinrich (2011) [1962]. Goering: The Rise and Fall of the Notorious Nazi Leader. London: Skyhorse. ISBN 978-1-61608-109-6.
- Matikkala, Antti (2017). Kunnian ruletti: Korkeimmat ulkomaalaisille 1941–1944 annetut suomalaiset kunniamerkit (in Finnish). Helsinki: Suomalaisen Kirjallisuuden Seura. ISBN 978-952-222-847-5.
- Miller, Michael D. (2006). Leaders of the SS and German Police, Vol. 1. San Jose, CA: R. James Bender. ISBN 978-93-297-0037-2.
- Miller, Michael D.; Schulz, Andreas (2015). Leaders of the Storm Troops, Vol. 1. Solihull, West Midlands: Helion & Company. ISBN 978-1-909982-87-1.
- Mosley, Leonard (1974). The Reich Marshal: A Biography of Hermann Goering. Garden City, NJ: Doubleday. ISBN 0-385-04961-7.
- Murray, Williamson (1983). Strategy for Defeat: The Luftwaffe, 1933–1945. Maxwell Air Force Base, AL: Air University Press. OCLC 9110598.
- "Nazi Conspiracy and Aggression, Volume 2, Chapter XV, Part 3: The Reich Cabinet" (PDF). Office of United States Chief of Counsel For Prosecution of Axis Criminality. 1946.
- Noakes, Jeremy; Pridham, Geoffrey, eds. (2001) [1988]. Nazism 1919–1945: Foreign Policy, War and Racial Extermination. Exeter Studies in History. Vol. 3. Exeter: University of Exeter Press.
- "Nuremberg Trial Proceedings, Volume 9: Eighty-fourth day, Monday, 18 March 1946, morning session". The Avalon Project. New Haven, Connecticut: Yale Law School, Lillian Goldman Law Library.
- The Nuremberg Trials (Newsreel). British Pathé. 1945. Event occurs at 1:22.
- New York Times (2 January 1958). "U. S. Psychiatrist in Nazi Trial Dies; Coast Police Say Dr. Douglas Kelley Swallowed Capsule of Potassium Cyanide". The New York Times. p. 18. Archived from the original on 9 November 2025.
- Oestermann, Günter (2001). Junger Wolf im Nebel. Ein Junge in Deutschland 1930–1945 (in German). Hamburg: [Norderstedt] Books on Demand. ISBN 978-3-8311-2487-9.
- "OSS (USS Office of Strategic Services) Art Looting Intelligence Unit (ALIU) Reports 1945–1946 and ALIU Red Flag Names List and Index". Central Registry of Information on Looted Cultural Property 1933–1945.
- Overy, Richard (2012) [1984]. Goering: Hitler's Iron Knight. London and New York: I.B. Tauris. ISBN 978-1-84885-932-6.
- Overy, Richard J. (2001). Interrogations: The Nazi Elite in Allied Hands, 1945. New York: Viking. ISBN 978-0-670-03008-8.
- Overy, Richard J. (2002) [1994]. War and Economy in the Third Reich. Oxford; New York: Oxford University Press. ISBN 978-0-19-164737-6.
- Petrov, Todor (2005). Bulgarian Orders and Medals 1878–2005. Sofia: Military Publishing House Ltd. ISBN 954-509-317-X.
- Pohl, Dieter (2012). Die Herrschaft der Wehrmacht: Deutsche Militärbesatzung und einheimische Bevölkerung in der Sowjetunion 1941–1944 (in German). Oldenbourg Wissenschaftsverlag. ISBN 978-3-486-70739-7.
- "Prussian Diet Out For 4-Year Period: Adopts Act Transferring All Its Powers to the Cabinet Headed by Goering". The New York Times. 19 May 1933. p. 8.
- Raeder, Erich (2001). Erich Raeder, Grand Admiral: The Personal Memoir of the Commander in Chief of the German Navy From 1935 Until His Final Break With Hitler in 1943. London: Da Capo Press United States Naval Institute. ISBN 0-306-80962-1.
- Rothfeld, Anne (2002). "Nazi Looted Art: The Holocaust Records Preservation Project, Part 1". Prologue Magazine. 34 (3). US National Archives and Records Administration.
- Royal Air Force Museum (2026). "Medal Bar of Reichsmarschall Hermann Göring". RAF Museum Collections. Royal Air Force Museum.
- Ryan, Joan (6 February 2005). "Mysterious suicide of Nuremberg psychiatrist". San Francisco Chronicle. Archived from the original on 1 March 2026.
- Schiff, Barry (5 July 2015). "Little airplane, big job: The poor man's warbird". AOPA Pilot. Archived from the original on 13 December 2025.
- Selwood, Dominic (13 February 2015). "Dresden was a civilian town with no military significance. Why did we burn its people?". The Telegraph. Archived from the original on 13 February 2015.
- Shirer, William L. (1960). The Rise and Fall of the Third Reich. New York: Simon & Schuster. LCCN 60-6729.
- Speer, Albert (1971) [1969]. Inside the Third Reich. New York: Avon. ISBN 978-0-380-00071-5.
- Stolfi, Russel (March 1982). "Barbarossa Revisited: A Critical Reappraisal of the Opening Stages of the Russo-German Campaign (June–December 1941)" (PDF). Journal of Modern History. 54 (1): 27–46. doi:10.1086/244076. hdl:10945/44218. S2CID 143690841.
- Taylor, A. J. P. (1965). English History 1914–1945. Reading, Berkshire: Oxford University Press. ISBN 0-19-280140-6.
- Taylor, Telford (1992). The Anatomy of the Nuremberg Trials. New York: Knopf. ISBN 978-0-394-58355-6.
- United States Army Air Forces. "Interrogation of Reich Marshal Hermann Goering". Combined Arms Research Library. United States Army Air Forces.

Military offices
Preceded by Erich Wieland	Commanding Officer of Jasta 27; 1917–1918	Succeeded by Hermann Frommherz
Preceded by Wilhelm Reinhard	Commanding Officer of Jagdgeschwader 1; 1918	Succeeded by Erich Rüdiger von Wedel
Preceded by Erich Rüdiger von Wedel	Commanding Officer of Jagdgeschwader 1; 1918	Unit disbanded
New title Luftwaffe re-established	Commander-in-Chief of the Luftwaffe; 1935–1945	Succeeded by Robert Ritter von Greim
Political offices
Preceded by Hans Ulrich Klintzsch	Supreme SA Leader; 1923	Vacant Title next held by Franz Pfeffer von Salomon
Preceded by Paul Löbe	President of the Reichstag; 1932–1945	Reichstag abolished
Preceded by Franz von Papen (Reichskomissar)	Prime Minister of Prussia; 1933–1945	Prussia abolished
Preceded by Adolf Hitler	Reichsstatthalter of Prussia; 1933–1945	Prussia abolished
Preceded by Robert Ley	President of the Prussian State Council; 1933–1945	Prussia abolished
New title New ministry established	Reichsminister of Aviation; 1933–1945	Ministry abolished
Preceded by Hjalmar Schacht	Reichsminister of Economics; 1937–1938	Succeeded by Walther Funk
