= Albert Göring =

German anti-Nazi businessman (1895–1966)

- Göring in 1936
- Born: Albert Günther Göring; 9 March 1895; Friedenau, Berlin, German Empire
- Died: 20 December 1966 (aged 71); Neuenbürg, West Germany
- Resting place: Göring family plot, Munich
- Education: Technical University of Munich
- Occupations: Engineer; businessman
- Known for: Anti-Nazi activities
- Spouses: Maria von Ummon (divorced); Erna von Miltner (divorced); Mila Klazarova (divorced); Brunhilde Seiwaldstätter (his death)
- Children: Elizabeth Göring
- Parents: Heinrich Ernst Göring; Franziska Tiefenbrunn
- Relatives: Hermann Göring (brother); Edda Göring (niece)

Albert Günther Göring (9 March 1895 – 20 December 1966) was a German engineer, businessman, and the younger brother of Hermann Göring (head of the German Luftwaffe, founder of the Gestapo, and leading member of the Nazi Party). In contrast to his brother, Albert was opposed to Nazism, and helped Jews and others persecuted in Nazi Germany. He was shunned in post-war Germany because of his family name, and died without any public recognition, receiving scant attention for his humanitarian efforts until decades after his death.

== Early life and family ==
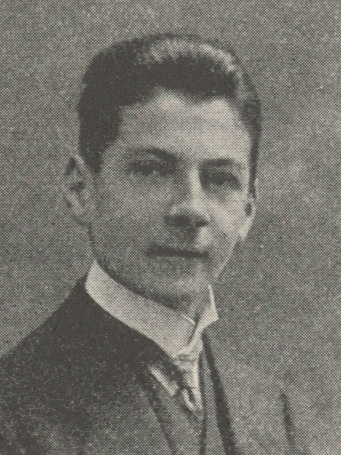
Albert Göring in his youth

Albert Günther Göring was born on 9 March 1895 in the Berlin suburb of Friedenau. He was the fifth child of the former Reichskommissar to German South-West Africa and German Consul General to Haiti, Heinrich Ernst Göring, and his wife, Franziska "Fanny" Tiefenbrunn, who came from a Bavarian peasant family.

The Görings were relatives of numerous residents of the Eberle/Eberlin area in Switzerland and Germany, among them German Counts Zeppelin, including aviation pioneer Ferdinand von Zeppelin; German nationalist art historian Herman Grimm, author of the concept of the German hero as a mover of history that was later embraced by the Nazis; Swiss historian of art and cultural, political and social thinker Jacob Burckhardt; Swiss diplomat, historian and President of the International Red Cross Carl J. Burckhardt; the Merck family, owners of the German pharmaceutical giant Merck; and German Catholic writer and poet Gertrud von Le Fort.

The Göring family lived with their children's aristocratic godfather of Jewish heritage, Hermann Epenstein Ritter von Mauternburg, in his Veldenstein and Mauterndorf castles. Epenstein was a prominent physician and acted as a surrogate father to the children as Heinrich Göring was often absent from the family home. Albert was one of five children. His brothers were Hermann and Karl Ernst Göring, and his sisters were Olga Therese Sophia and Paula Elisabeth Rosa Göring.

Epenstein began an affair with Franziska Göring about a year before Albert's birth. A strong physical resemblance between Epenstein and Albert Göring even led many to believe that they were father and son. If this were true, it meant that Albert Göring was one-quarter Jewish. However, Franziska Göring had accompanied her husband to his post in Port-au-Prince, Haiti, and lived there with him between March 1893 and mid-1894, which makes this seem extremely unlikely.

During World War I, Albert served in the trenches with the Imperial German army as a signal engineer.

== Anti-Nazi activity ==
Göring seemed to have acquired his godfather's character as a bon vivant and looked set to lead an "unremarkable life" as a filmmaker, until the Nazis came to power in 1933. Unlike his elder brother Hermann, a leading party member, Albert Göring despised Nazism and the brutality involved.

Many anecdotal stories exist about Göring's resistance to the Nazi ideology and regime. For example, Albert is reported to have joined a group of Jewish women who had been forced to scrub the street. The SS officer in charge inspected his identification, and ordered the group's scrubbing activity to stop after realizing he could be held responsible for allowing Hermann Göring's brother to be publicly humiliated.

Albert Göring used his influence to get his Jewish former boss Oskar Pilzer freed after the Nazis arrested him. Göring then helped Pilzer and his family escape from Germany. He is reported to have done the same for numerous other German dissidents.

Göring intensified his anti-Nazi activity when he was made export director at the Škoda Works in the Protectorate of Bohemia and Moravia (occupied part of the former Czechoslovakia). He encouraged minor acts of sabotage and had contact with the Czech resistance. On many occasions, he forged his brother's signature on transit documents to enable dissidents to escape. When he was caught, he used his brother's influence to gain his release. Göring also sent trucks to Nazi concentration camps with requests for labourers. The trucks would stop in an isolated area, and their passengers were then allowed to escape.

After the war, Albert Göring was questioned during the Nuremberg trials. However, many of those he had helped testified in his defense, and he was released. Soon afterwards, Göring was arrested by Czechoslovak authorities, but again released when the full extent of his activities became known.

In 2010, Edda Göring, the daughter of Hermann, said of her uncle Albert in The Guardian:

He could certainly help people in need himself financially and with his personal influence, but, as soon as it was necessary to involve higher authority or officials, then he had to have the support of my father, which he did get.

== Later life ==
On his release, Göring returned to Germany, but was shunned because of his family name. He found occasional work as a writer and translator, and lived in a modest flat far from the baronial splendour of his childhood. Having known of his infidelities, his Czech wife Mila divorced him and migrated to Lima, Peru, with their daughter Elizabeth. In his last years, Göring lived on a pension from the government. He knew that if he married, on his death the pension payments would be transferred to his wife. As a sign of gratitude, he married his housekeeper in 1966 so she would receive his pension. One week later, Albert Göring died without his wartime anti-Nazi activities having been publicly acknowledged.

Although Göring lived out his last years in Munich in Bavaria, he died further away in a hospital in Neuenbürg in the neighbouring state of Baden-Württemberg.

== Reception and popular culture ==
Albert Göring's story remained largely unknown to the public even three decades after his death. While his brother Hermann Göring was the subject of many publications, Albert received little or no attention. One exception was a short article in German weekly magazine aktuell by writer Ernst Neubach in the early 1960s, when Göring was still alive. At the end of the 20th and beginning of the 21st century, Albert Göring and his work became the subject of several books and documentaries, in turn triggering a larger number of new publications.

=== Books ===
In 2006, British author James Wyllie published a double biography The Warlord and the Renegade. Göring was also covered in the 2011 book Rettungswiderstand (Resistance to save) by German historian and Holocaust survivor Arno Lustiger.

Göring's humanitarian efforts were recorded by William Hastings Burke in the book Thirty Four (ISBN 978-0-95637120-1). A review of the 2009 book in The Jewish Chronicle concluded with a call for Albert Göring to be honoured at the Yad Vashem memorial; however, Yad Vashem subsequently announced that Göring would not be listed as Righteous Among the Nations, stating that although "[t]here are indications that Albert Goering had a positive attitude to Jews and that he helped some people," there is not "sufficient proof, i.e., primary sources, showing that he took extraordinary risks to save Jews from danger of deportation and death."

=== Documentaries ===
Göring was the subject of film documentaries, the first and most extensive being The Real Albert Goering, produced by 3BM TV and broadcast in the United Kingdom in 1998. The documentary was picked up by the History Channel for foreign distribution and made its way to other countries, notably the United States, during the early 2000s. Roughly a decade later, William Hastings Burke produced a documentary based on his book, and in 2014 Véronique Lhorme's Le Dossier Albert Göring was broadcast on French TV.

In January 2016, German TV channel Das Erste broadcast the docudrama Der gute Göring (The Good Göring) with Barnaby Metschurat as Albert Göring and Francis Fulton-Smith as his brother Hermann. In 2018, Emmanuel Amara directed La liste Goring ("Göring's List") for Toute L'Histoire. A BBC Radio 4 documentary entitled The Good Göring, also broadcast in January 2016, featured an investigation of the life of Albert Göring by British journalist and broadcaster Gavin Esler.

== See also ==
- Heinz Heydrich, Reinhard Heydrich's younger brother who helped many Jews escape the Nazis.
- List of Germans who resisted Nazism
