= Heinrich Ernst Göring =

German diplomat (1838–1913)

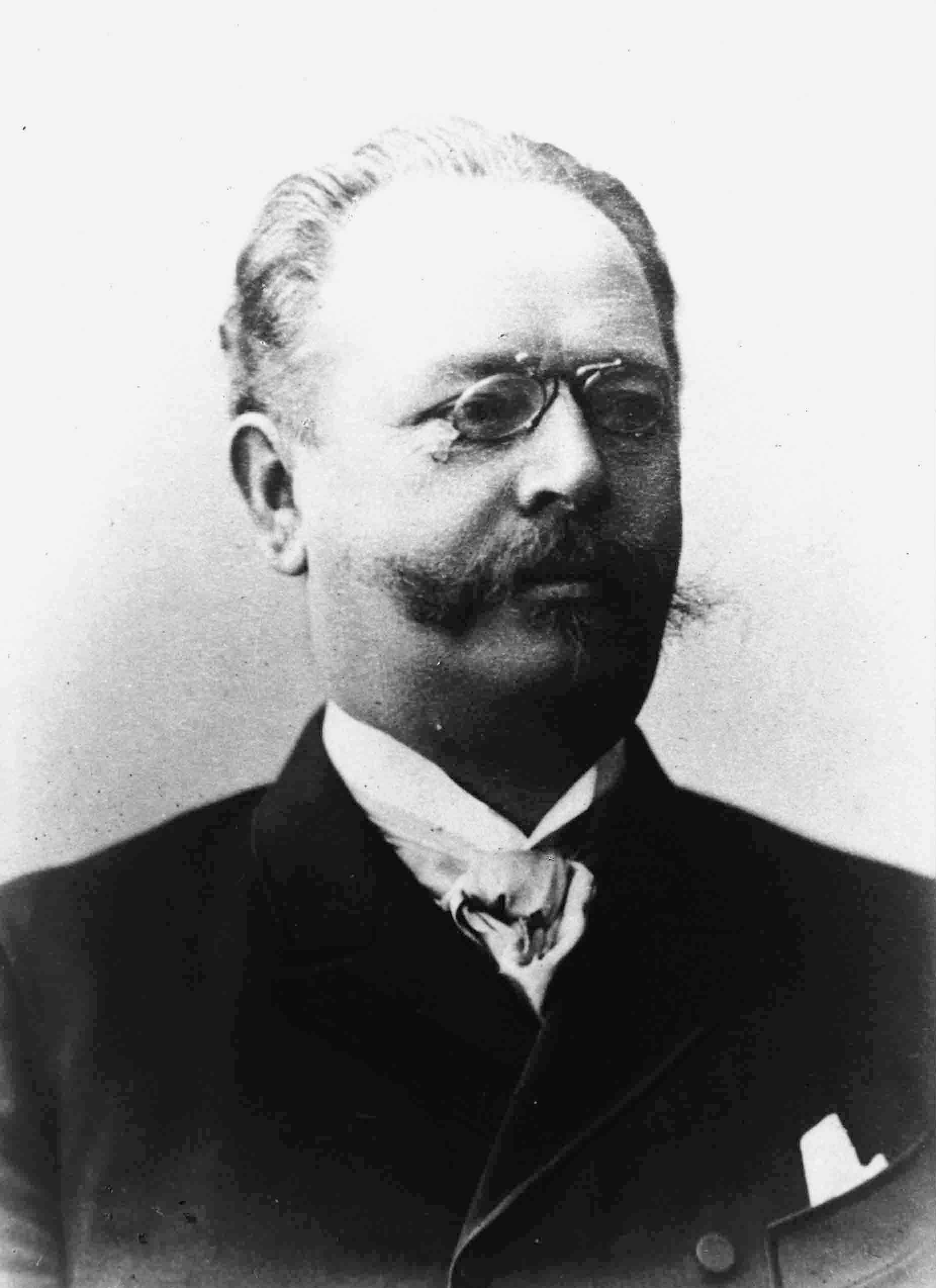

Reichskommissar for German South West Africa
- In office May 1885 – August 1890
- Preceded by: Gustav Nachtigal
- Succeeded by: Louis Nels

German Resident Minister for Haiti and the Dominican Republic
- In office 1892–1895
- Preceded by: Eduard Grisebach
- Succeeded by: Heinrich von Luxburg (*1855)

Personal details
- Born: 31 October 1838 Emmerich, Kingdom of Prussia
- Died: 7 December 1913 (aged 74) Munich, Kingdom of Bavaria, German Empire
- Spouse: Franziska Tiefenbrunn
- Children: 5, including Hermann and Albert
- Relatives: Edda Göring (granddaughter)

Heinrich Ernst Göring (31 October 1838 – 7 December 1913) was a German judge and diplomat who served as the colonial governor of German Namibia and the German Ambassador to Haiti. He was the father of five children including Hermann Göring, the Nazi leader and commander of the Luftwaffe (German Air Force).

== Early life ==
Göring was born in Emmerich am Rhein. He was the son of Wilhelm Göring (1791–1874), and his wife, Caroline Maria de Nerée (1815–1886).

== Career ==
After a career as a provincial judge, the Dutch-speaking Göring was appointed as the first Imperial Commissioner of German South West Africa in 1885. (German commercial interests had forced the Imperial Chancellor, Otto von Bismarck, into creating a state-financed colonial administration to support his country's fledgling Protectorate of South West Africa.)

Göring started by signing a "protection treaty" with the leading Herero chief, Maharero. The treaty of protection was not worth the paper on which it was written, as Göring was in no position to offer assistance. Repeated armed attacks by Witbooi's Nama clan proved the point. The treaty was repudiated a few years later by Maharero, who also expelled Göring from Hereroland. The Germans' behaviour had become too much, and, worst of all, Göring had (perhaps unwittingly) extended his house on top of a Herero ancestral graveyard. An alleged discovery of gold c. 1887 was a hoax: the purported gold deposits were nothing apart from the remains of gold pieces fired at a rock face. The identity of the hoaxer remains a mystery, but suspicion falls on Göring making a last-ditch desperate attempt to bring investment to the protectorate and thus to save his failing mission.

Göring left South West Africa in August 1890 without having been able to settle the constant friction between the Herero and the Oorlam people. The expected vast gold deposits started a gold rush of German settlers and investors, whose behaviour further alienated the Herero. This eventually led to the Herero and Nama genocide (1904–1908) under Lothar von Trotha. Herero skulls were eventually used by the Kaiser Wilhelm Institute of Anthropology, Human Heredity, and Eugenics, which pursued a policy of eugenics.

From 1892 to 1895, Göring resided in Haiti's capital, Port-au-Prince, as the German resident minister for Haiti and the Dominican Republic.

== Personal life ==
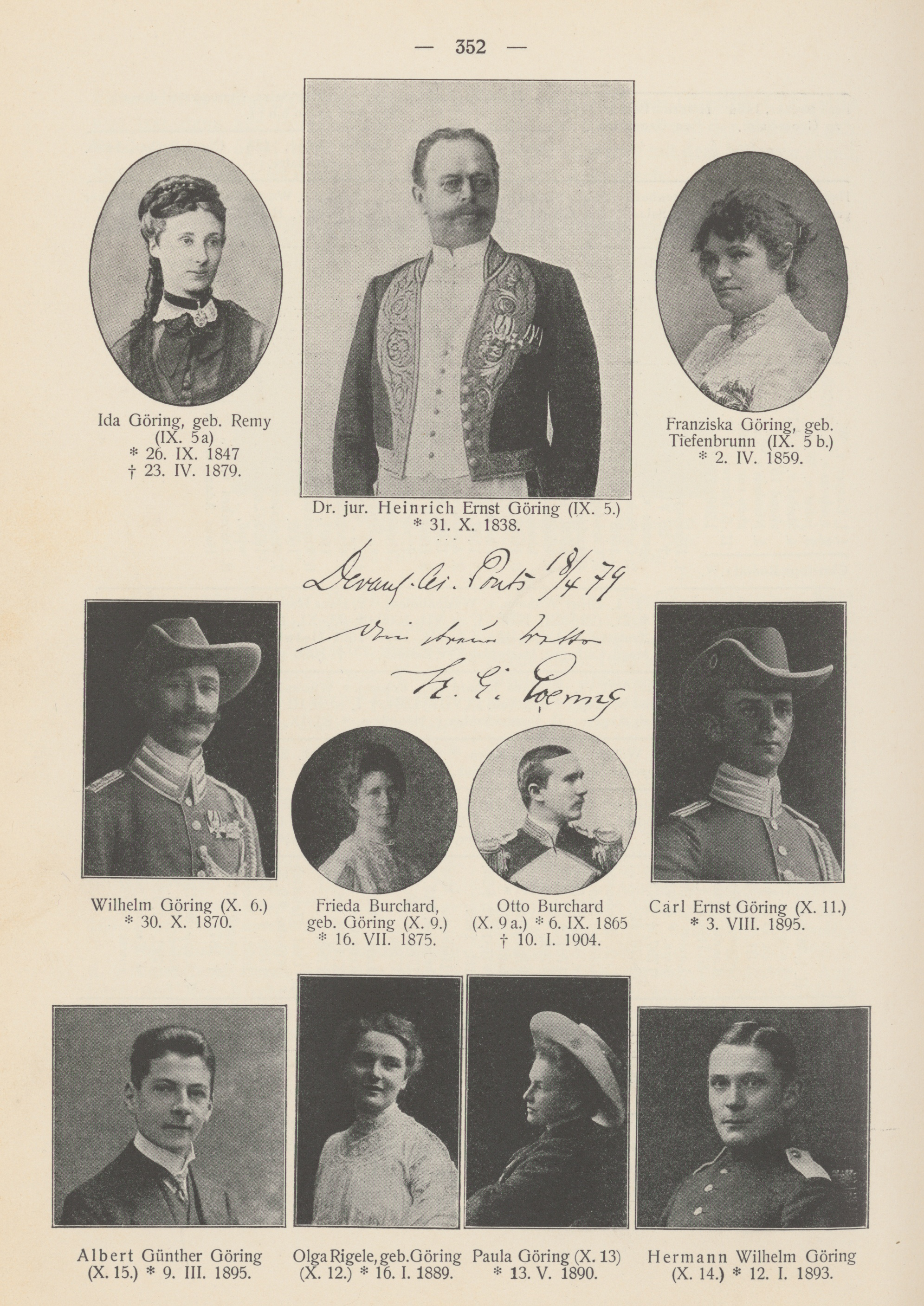
Heinrich Ernst Göring with his wives and children (not shown: Ernst Albert Göring and Heinrich Carl Göring), from a family chronicle from 1911

Göring married, secondly, to Franziska Tiefenbrunn: the marriage produced five recorded children:

- Karl-Ernst Göring (1885–1932), a jurist.
- Olga Therese Sophie Göring (1889–1970)
- Paula Elisabeth Rosa Göring (1890–1960)
- Hermann Göring (1893–1946), German politician, military leader, and leading member of the Nazi Party.
- Albert Göring (1895–1966), businessman.

Göring died in Munich on 7 December 1913.

== Bibliography ==
- Gewald, Jan-Bart (1999), Herero Heroes: A Socio-political History of the Herero of Namibia 1890-1923, Oxford: James Currey, ISBN 0-85255-749-3
- Olusoga, David; Erichsen, Casper W (2011) [2010], The Kaiser's Holocaust: Germany's Forgotten Genocide, London: Faber and Faber, ISBN 978-0-571-23142-3
- Wellington, John H. (1967), South West Africa and Its Human Issues, London: Oxford University Press
