= Margaret Carroux =

German translator (1912–1991)

Margaret Carroux in 1977

Margaret Carroux (31 May 1912 – 22 July 1991) was a German translator who translated from English and French into German. Born in Berlin into an international family, she studied economy, English and French before working as a commercial clerk and as foreign language correspondent. After World War II, she worked for the American military government before moving to Frankfurt, where she did translations and news agency work. In the 1960s, she started translating books; the first of more than eighty was Moshe Pearlman's The capture of Adolf Eichmann. Under the pseudonyms Martin Boor and Emmi Heimann, she translated books by Guillaume Chpaltine and Leopold Trepper from French to German.

Carroux's best-known work is the first German translation of J. R. R. Tolkien's The Lord of the Rings, which appeared in 1969 and 1970. Her translation was done in dialogue with Tolkien and used his Guide to the Names in the Lord of the Ring, and has been described as classy and respectful. In 1983, she published a translation of the Tolkien parody Bored of the Rings.

== Life and family ==
Margaret Bister was born on 31 May 1912 into a German-speaking international family in Berlin. (Note: Most of what is known about Carroux's life is from a 1977 article by Elsemarie Maletzke that is based on an interview with Carroux.) Her father, who was born in Berlin, was originally French and later went to the US where he married his deceased first wife's sister before returning to Germany. Her mother was originally Jewish but had been baptised as a child. Carroux studied economy, English and French in Berlin but dropped out after she suspected her advisor was a Nazi. She then worked as a commercial clerk and as a foreign language correspondent. After the end of World War II, she worked for the American military government, further improving her English. Together with an American friend, she founded a subsidiary of Overseas Weekly and offered translations of American articles to German newspapers. She moved to Frankfurt in 1949, where she co-founded an international news agency. She married a civil engineer and had two children.

Carroux died on 22 July 1991. In his eulogy at her funeral on 1 August 1991, the translator Klaus Birkenhauer remembered Carroux's raspy voice, the "sparkling brevity" in her use of language and the hospitality she offered to other translators during the Frankfurt Book Fair. He also praised her "brilliant" contributions to a translator-built dictionary.

== Translation work ==
In the 1960s, after the end of her marriage, Carroux started to translate books from English and French. Her first published translation was of Moshe Pearlman's The capture of Adolf Eichmann, which appeared as Die Festnahme des Adolf Eichmann at S. Fischer Verlag in 1961. From 1967, she was a member of the VdÜ, the German association of translators; she contributed several articles to its members' journal, Der Übersetzer. By 1977, she had translated 87 books and was a sought after translator who earned up to DM 19.80 per page (equivalent to €24.50 in 2021). Her translation work included both fiction and non-fiction, especially from the humanities. Besides her own name, she used the pseudonyms "Emmi Heimann" and "Martin Boor". As Martin Boor, she translated La Renonce ou Le tracé des frontières relatives by Guillaume Chpaltine as Die nichtgespielte Karte; the book appeared in 1963. As Emmi Heimann, she translated the autobiography of Leopold Trepper, Le grand jeu into German as Die Wahrheit, appearing in 1975. Other authors translated by Carroux include Betty Friedan, Arthur Janov, Miles Tripp, Sébastien Japrisot, Edna O'Brien, Chaim Potok, Françoise Sagan and Nadine Gordimer.

== Translating Tolkien ==
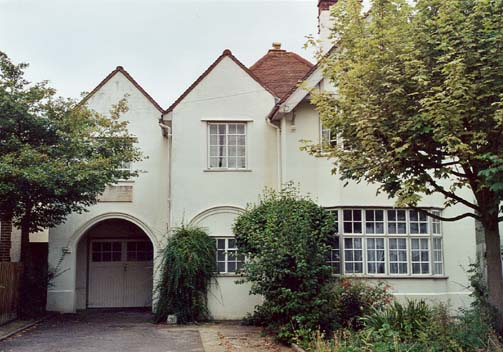
Tolkien received Carroux in his unheated study, a converted garage (doorway at left) of his house at Sandfield Road, Oxford.

The German publishing house Ernst Klett Verlag (later Klett-Cotta Verlag) made an offer for the German translation rights for J. R. R. Tolkien's epic fantasy book The Lord of the Rings in October 1966. After other translators had declined, Klett asked Carroux to translate it. Carroux first translated Tolkien's story "Leaf by Niggle"; her translation (which appeared in 1975 in the collection Fabelhafte Geschichten) was sent to Tolkien as a sample of her work via his publisher, Rayner Unwin, in September 1967. A visit of Carroux in Oxford was arranged for December 1967, shortly after Tolkien had received the first 110 pages of her translation. Carroux arrived on a cold day with a suitcase full of books and was received by Tolkien in his unheated study, a converted garage. (Note: Tolkien had converted his garage to compensate for losing his room at Merton College when he retired. He later wrote to Charlotte and Denis Plimmer, referencing the phrase "the cramped garage that he uses as a study" they used in a draft article for The Daily Telegraph Magazine, saying "May I say that it is not a 'study', except in domestic slang: in happier days I had one. It was a hastily contrived necessity, when I was obliged to relinquish my room in college and provide a store for what I could preserve of my library. ... I have never written any literary matter in it. ... [M]y house has no reception room but my wife's sitting-room, filled with her personal belongings. This was contemptuously described in the New Yorker ... Since then she has refused to admit anybody but personal friends to the room.") Both Tolkien and his wife were ill, so he was unable to offer any refreshments, and he was testy and tight-lipped, so Carroux left again after just one hour. They continued to be in contact via mail. She found it difficult to translate especially the poetry, but Tolkien encouraged her after seeing further specimens, stated that he hoped to see poetry and prose translated by the same person, and offered further assistance. According to Carroux, Tolkien discreetly voiced some disapproval of her poetry, and she herself doubted her ability. The poetry was finally translated by Ebba-Margareta von Freymann. The book appeared as Der Herr der Ringe in three volumes in 1969 and 1970.

In response to his dissatisfaction with the Dutch and Swedish translations of the Lord of the Rings, Tolkien had created a Guide to the Names in the Lord of the Ring, a glossary with instructions for translators. Carroux generally followed his guidelines, as in translating the innkeeper's name "Barliman Butterbur" as Gerstenmann Butterblume. For "Shelob", a giant spider whose name is composed of the female-indicating "she" and "lob", a dialectal word for spider, Carroux changed Kanker, an old German term for spider, to a female form, resulting in "Kankra". For "The Shire", Tolkien would have preferred Gau, but worried that its Nazi use might have made the word unacceptable to use. Carroux shared this concern (which she explained in her translation of the appendices), and chose Auenland ('meadow-land') instead.

Carroux's translations were described by the contemporary reviewer Eugen Skasa-Weiß as "resonant" and "blissfully clear". However, there were various errors, some of them caused by Carroux's lack of knowledge of the background of Tolkien's writing that would later appear as the Silmarillion. Other mistakes were introduced by her editor, who insisted on translating some English standing expressions literally. The Tolkien scholar Susanne Stopfel gives as her overall verdict, "It is a very classy translation that treats its source with enormous respect." Some of the mistranslations were corrected in a later edition by Roswitha Krege-Mayer in 1991. Wolfgang Krege, the translator of the Silmarillion into German, criticised that Carroux's translation had applied a "uniform fairy-tale tone" to the diverse styles of the original. He created his own new translation of the Lord of the Rings that used a greater variety of German styles to correspond to different manners of speech in the original.

In addition to Tolkien's Lord of the Rings, Carroux also translated the 1969 parody Bored of the Rings into German. The book appeared in 1983 as Der Herr der Augenringe ('Lord of the eye-rings'). In an "apology" published in 1984, Carroux explained her motivation for translating this parody. While she was not as fascinated as by the original text, she welcomed the challenge posed by the combination of Tolkien-inspired antiquated language with recent dirty American slang. She also pointed out that the title had been translated by the publisher, not by her.

== Translations ==
=== From English ===
- Perlman, Mosheh (1961). Die Festnahme des Adolf Eichmann [The Capture of Adolf Eichmann] (in German). Translated by Carroux, Margaret; Leonard, Lis. Frankfurt a.M.: S. Fischer. OCLC 164668652.
- Gilbert, Gustave Mark (1962). Nürnberger Tagebuch [Nuremberg Diary]. Fischer Bücherei (in German). Vol. 447/48. Translated by Carroux, Margaret; Krausskopf, Karin; Leonard, Lis. Frankfurt a.M.: Fischer Bücherei. OCLC 1069809662.
- Salisbury, Harrison E. (1962). Diesseits und jenseits von Moskau: Ein Reisebericht [To Moscow and Beyond]. Fischer Paperbacks (in German). Translated by Carroux, Margaret; Duden, Lis. Frankfurt a.M: S. Fischer. OCLC 600803714.
- Edwardes, Michael (1962). Die Zukunft Asiens [Asia in the Balance]. Fischer Bücherei (in German). Translated by Carroux, Margaret; Duden, Lis. Frankfurt a.M.; Hamburg: Fischer Bücherei. OCLC 163750530.
- O'Brien, Conor Cruise (1963). Meine Mission in Katanga [To Katanga and back] (in German). Translated by Carroux, Margaret. München: List. OCLC 68727341.
- Payne, Robert (1964). Albert Schweitzer und seine drei Welten: Biographie [Three Worlds of Albert Schweitzer] (in German). Translated by Carroux, Margaret. Konstanz; Zürich: Diana Verlag. OCLC 163799031.
- Freeling, Nicolas (1965). Van der Valk und die Katzen: Kriminalroman [Because of the Cats]. rororo Taschenbuch (in German). Reinbek b. Hamburg: Rowohlt. OCLC 73372568.
- Tripp, Miles (1965). Duell zu dritt: Kriminalroman [Kilo Forty]. rororo Taschenbuch (in German). Translated by Carroux, Margaret. Reinbek b. Hamburg: Rowohlt. OCLC 73747603.
- Prokosch, Frederic (1966). Und kalt glänzte der Marmor: Ein Roman um das Tadsch Mahal [The Dark Dancer] (in German). Translated by Carroux, Margaret. Reinbek b. Hamburg: Rowohlt. OCLC 164708005.
- Doctor X (1966). Tagebuch eines jungen Arztes [Intern] (in German). Translated by Carroux, Margaret. München; Zürich: Droemersche Verl. Anst. Knaur. OCLC 72088061.
- Greene, Felix (1966). Listen, Lügen, Lobbies: China im Zerrspiegel der öffentlichen Meinung [A Curtain of Ignorance] (in German). Translated by Carroux, Margaret. Darmstadt: Melzer. OCLC 164389705.
- Molnar, Thomas (1966). Kampf und Untergang der Intellektuellen [The Decline of the Intellectual] (in German). Translated by Carroux, Margaret. München: Beck. OCLC 10655251.
- Spring, Robert Howard (1966). Es fing damit an: Roman [Winds of the Day] (in German). Translated by Carroux, Margaret. Hamburg: Claassen. OCLC 164708073.
- Friedan, Betty (1966). Der Weiblichkeitswahn oder Die Mystifizierung der Frau [The Feminine Mystique] (in German). Translated by Carroux, Margaret. Reinbek bei Hamburg: Rowohlt. OCLC 73768576.
- O'Brien, Edna (1969). Mädchen im Eheglück: Roman [Girls in Their Married Bliss] (in German). Translated by Carroux, Margaret. Reinbek b. Hamburg: Rowohlt. OCLC 72316080.
- Tolkien, John Ronald Reuel (1969). Die Gefährten [The Fellowship of the Ring]. Der Herr der Ringe (in German). Vol. 1. Translated by Carroux, Margaret; von Freymann, Ebba-Margareta. Stuttgart: Ernst Klett. OCLC 1281602331.
- Tolkien, John Ronald Reuel (1970). Die zwei Türme [The Two Towers]. Der Herr der Ringe (in German). Vol. 2. Translated by Carroux, Margaret; von Freymann, Ebba-Margareta. Stuttgart: Ernst Klett. OCLC 1281602801.
- Tolkien, John Ronald Reuel (1970). Die Rückkehr des Königs [The Return of the King]. Der Herr der Ringe (in German). Vol. 3. Translated by Carroux, Margaret; von Freymann, Ebba-Margareta. Stuttgart: Ernst Klett. OCLC 1281602775.
- Stermer, Dugald (1970). Kunst der Revolution: 100 Plakate aus Kuba [The Art of Revolution] (in German). Translated by Carroux, Margaret. Köln Berlin: Kiepenheuer & Witsch. OCLC 164866618.
- Khrushchev, Nikita (1971). Chruschtschow erinnert sich [Khrushchev remembers] (in German). Translated by Carroux, Margaret. Reinbek b. Hamburg: Rowohlt. ISBN 978-3-498-00834-5.
- Sladek, John Thomas (1972). Der Müller-Fokker-Effekt: Roman [The Müller-Fokker Effect] (in German). Translated by Carroux, Margaret. Stuttgart: Gebühr. ISBN 978-3-920014-04-3.
- Dryer, Bernard Victor (1973). Arzt der Verdammten: Roman [The Torch Bearers] (in German). Translated by Carroux, Margaret. Bergisch Gladbach: Bastei-Verl. ISBN 978-3-404-00050-0.
- Janov, Arthur (1975). Der Urschrei: ein neuer Weg der Psychotherapie [The Primal Scream] (in German). Translated by Carroux, Margaret. Frankfurt am Main: Fischer Taschenbuch Verlag. ISBN 978-3-436-02140-5.
- Pearson, Diane (1976). Csárdás: Roman [Csardas] (in German). Translated by Carroux, Margaret. Reinbek bei Hamburg: Rowohlt. ISBN 978-3-498-05230-0.
- Potok, Chaim (1976). Mein Name ist Ascher Lev: Roman [My Name Is Asher Lev]. rororo (in German). Translated by Carroux, Margaret. Reinbek bei Hamburg: Rowohlt. ISBN 978-3-499-14012-9.
- Tolkien, John Ronald Reuel (1978). Der Herr der Ringe. Anhänge: Annalen der Könige und Herrscher; Zeittafel der Westlande; Familienstammbäume; Auenlandkalender; Schriftzeichen und Buchstaben [The Lord of the Rings. Appendices] (in German). Translated by Carroux, Margaret; von Freymann, Ebba-Margareta. Stuttgart: Klett-Cotta. ISBN 978-3-12-907980-5.
- Gordimer, Nadine (1982). July's Leute: Roman [July's People] (in German). Translated by Carroux, Margaret. Frankfurt am Main: S. Fischer. ISBN 978-3-10-027005-4.
- Beard, Henry N.; Kenney, Douglas C. (1983). Der Herr der Augenringe: die Parodie [Bored of the Rings] (in German). Translated by Carroux, Margaret. München: Goldmann. ISBN 978-3-442-23835-4.

=== From French ===
- Kostolany, André (1961). Das ist die Börse: Bekenntnisse eines Spekulanten [Si la bourse m'était contée] (in German). Translated by Carroux, Margaret. Stuttgart: Goverts. OCLC 632479407.
- Maurienne (1962). Der Deserteur und sein Prozess [Le Déserteur] (in German). Translated by Carroux, Margaret. Stuttgart: Goverts. OCLC 73538154.
- Paoli, Paul (1963). Die Tauben von Neapel: Kriminalroman [Les Pigeons de Naples]. rororo Taschenbuch (in German). Translated by Carroux, Margaret. Reinbek b. Hamburg: Rowohlt. OCLC 73615734.
- Chpaltine, Guillaume (1963). Die nichtgespielte Karte: Roman [La Renonce ou Le tracé des frontières relatives] (in German). Translated by Boor, Martin. Reinbek b. Hamburg: Rowohlt. OCLC 17485405.
- Japrisot, Sébastien (1964). Mord im Fahrpreis inbegriffen: Kriminalroman [Compartiment Tueurs]. rororo Taschenbuch. Translated by Carroux, Margaret. Reinbek b. Hamburg: Rowohlt. OCLC 73475143.
- Moreau, Marcel (1964). Der rebellische Tag des Herrn Q [Quintes] (in German). Translated by Carroux, Margaret. Frankfurt a.M: Insel-Verlag. OCLC 164705754.
- Morin, Edgar (1965). Der Geist der Zeit: Versuch über die Massenkultur [L'Esprit du temps]. Essay (in German). Translated by Carroux, Margaret. Köln; Berlin: Kiepenheuer & Witsch. OCLC 164168088.
- Trepper, Leopold (1975). Die Wahrheit: Autobiographie [Le grand jeu] (in German). Translated by Heimann, Emmi. München: Kindler. ISBN 978-3-463-00643-7.
- Sagan, Françoise (1978). Edouard und Béatrice: Roman [Le lit défait] (in German). Translated by Carroux, Margaret. Berlin, Frankfurt/M., Wien: Ullstein. ISBN 978-3-550-06283-4.
