= Howard Triest =

US Army soldier and translator (1923–2016)

Howie Triest
- Born: March 29, 1923; Munich, Weimar Republic
- Died: May 11, 2016 (aged 93) Oak Park, Michigan, US
- Allegiance: United States
- Branch: US Army
- Service years: 1943–1945
- Rank: Sergeant
- Known for: Translator during the Nuremberg Trials
- Conflicts: World War II; Operation Overlord
- Spouse: Anita Triest
- Children: 2

Sergeant Howard Triest ("Howie", born Hans Heinz Triest; March 29, 1923 – May 11, 2016) was a German-born United States Army soldier who served in World War II. He is most noted for serving as an interpreter on the Allied psychiatrist team during the Nuremberg trials.

== Early life ==
Triest was born in Munich on March 29, 1923, to Ly/Lina (Westheimer) and Berthold Triest, the older of two children. His father and uncles had served in the German army in the First World War. His father was the owner of a successful clothing factory that employed more than 100 people. After the Nazis came to power and antisemitism worsened in Germany, the Jewish Triest family departed for Luxembourg on August 31, 1939, a day before the invasion of Poland. Attempting to travel to America, they could only afford to send Howie. His younger sister, Margot (born 1929), went to Switzerland before moving to the United States. Ly and Berthold Triest, who were supposed to leave for the United States from Rotterdam the day Hitler invaded the Netherlands, were transferred to a French prison camp and later died either at or en route to Auschwitz.

== Arrival in the United States and wartime service ==
Triest arrived in New York in 1940, where he went to work at a tool factory. He attempted to enlist in the army several times but was denied on account of not being a United States citizen. He eventually succeeded in 1943 and obtained his citizenship shortly afterwards. He was posted to Europe, landing on Omaha Beach two days after D-Day as a machine gunner. He was eventually transferred to military intelligence owing to his knowledge of German.

After his discharge in the summer of 1945, Triest joined the Department of Defense, where he was sent to Nuremberg as an interpreter, working for Leon Goldensohn and Douglas Kelley. He later interacted with and interpreted between psychiatrists and several top Nazi officials, including Hermann Göring, Rudolf Hess and Julius Streicher.

== Personal life and death ==
Triest married Anita (née Hammersmith) and had two sons.

Triest died in Oak Park, Michigan on May 11, 2016, at the age of 93.

== In media ==
Triest is the subject of a 2006 documentary Journey to Justice and the 2012 book Inside Nuremberg Prison by Helen Fry. Triest was portrayed by actor Leo Woodall in the 2025 film Nuremberg. The movie is based on the 2013 book The Nazi and the Psychiatrist by Jack El-Hai, which provides much more factual detail about Triest's work with Nuremberg's chief psychiatrist Douglas Kelley.
