= Burton C. Andrus =

United States Army officer (1892–1977)

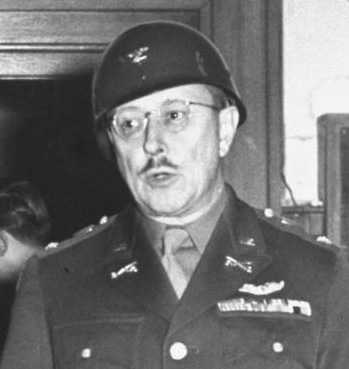
- Andrus in Nuremberg, c. 1945–1946
- Born: April 15, 1892; Fort Spokane, Washington, US
- Died: February 1, 1977 (aged 84); Tacoma, Washington, US
- Military career
- Allegiance: United States
- Branch: United States Army
- Service years: 1917–1952
- Rank: Colonel
- Commands: Commandant of the Nuremberg Prison
- Conflicts: World War I World War II
- Awards: Legion of Merit

Colonel Burton Curtis Andrus Sr. (April 15, 1892 – February 1, 1977) was a United States Army officer who served in World War II. He was an armor officer for most of his career and his most noted assignment was as the commandant of the Nuremberg Prison which housed the accused during the Nuremberg trials after the end of World War II in Europe.

== Biography ==
Burton Curtis Andrus was born in Fort Spokane, Washington on April 15, 1892, to Hermine (née Hill) and Major Frank B. Andrus, a United States Military Academy graduate, Class of 1881, who participated in the Philippine–American War in the Philippine Islands. He attended the University at Buffalo in 1914 and married Katherine Elizabeth Stebbins on April 12, 1916. He worked for the Standard Oil Company of New York from 1910 until he was called to active duty through the Officer Reserve Corps (ORC) in 1917.

== World War I through 1930s ==
Andrus was a 1st lieutenant in the Officer Reserve Corps when World War I began. On October 25, 1917, he was accepted in the Regular Army at Madison Barracks, New York, with the rank of 2nd lieutenant. He was transferred to Fort Oglethorpe, Georgia, and commanded Troop F, 11th Cavalry. On March 20, 1918, was promoted to 1st lieutenant, Cavalry, and in July 1919, he was promoted to captain and sent to the Presidio of Monterey, California, where he performed in various duties such as prison and intelligence officer.

On January 1, 1924, he was sent to the Philippine Islands in Command of Troop A, 26th Cavalry. In July 1926, he returned to the United States as a student at the United States Army Cavalry School, Fort Riley, Kansas. In 1927, he was the adjutant of the United States Army Cavalry School and in the 1928 school year he was a student of the Air Corps Tactical School. After completing his studies, he was assigned as an Air Corps instructor at the United States Army Cavalry School concurrent with assignments as liaison officer to the 16th Observation Squadron and officer in charge of Air Corps Observation Course.

In 1933, Andrus commanded a Civilian Conservation Corps Camp in Oregon and on January 1, 1934, he was assigned as plans and training officer, 13th Cavalry, until July 1934. Andrus was promoted to major on August 1, 1935, with the 7th Cavalry Brigade and then served with the 1st Armored Regiment.

== 1940s and World War II ==
On January 1, 1940, Major Andrus was transferred to the Pennsylvania National Guard Bureau in Tyrone, Pennsylvania and in July 1940 was transferred to Washington, D.C. On August 18, 1940, he was promoted to lieutenant colonel and placed in charge of air-ground cooperation. On November 1, 1940, he was assigned to be an instructor at the Armored Forces School.

In September 1941, Andrus was sent to Great Britain to study its air-ground operations. He observed Royal Air Force maneuvers and installations and returned to the United States in December. He then served as a board member at the United States Army Infantry School to develop and implement a cohesive air-ground cooperation, and aerial recognition and identification programs.

On January 13, 1942, Andrus was assigned to the 2nd Armored Division as G-3, Air and then as a tank commander. He was promoted to colonel on June 6, 1942. On October 10, 1942, Andrus was transferred to Caven Point Terminal, New Jersey as commandant and on January 1, 1943, to Brooklyn Army Base as the officer in charge of the Control Branch. After one week, on January 8, 1943, Andrus was reassigned as the executive officer at Fort Hamilton, New York. He held this position until August 28, 1943, when he was reassigned to be director of intelligence, Security Division, New York Port of Embarkation.

Transferring to Europe, Andrus was assigned on January 27, 1944, as commanding officer of the 10th Traffic Regulation Group (TRG). While assigned to the 10th TRG he was on detached duty as liaison officer with the 21st Army Group (British) from August 22 through December 10, 1944.

On December 26, 1944, he was reassigned to the G-3 (Operations) Branch, Headquarters, European Theater of Operations as a combat observer. He remained a combat observer until the war in Europe was over.

== Nuremberg ==
On May 20, 1945, Andrus was assigned as commandant, Prisoner of War Enclosure #32 in Mondorf-les-Bains, Luxembourg. The camp, codenamed "Ashcan", was an interrogation center for the most senior Nazi war criminals. On August 12, 1945, the prisoners were moved to a new prison in Nuremberg, Germany. The Nuremberg prison was adjacent to the courts where the Nuremberg trials were held. The security detachment at the prison, with Andrus as commandant, was established as the 6850th Internal Security Detachment (ISD), under the International Military Tribunal, United States Forces, European Theater (USFET).

Colonel Andrus was a strict disciplinarian who made no distinction between those Nazi leaders who were military or civilian, treating them all as war criminals. Andrus was instantly visible in his immaculate uniform and shellacked helmet and swagger stick. Albert Speer claimed (in his book Inside the Third Reich) that Andrus cordially greeted him when he arrived at Nuremberg Prison and also briefly mouthed an apology for having to maintain strict discipline. Contrary to Speer's claim, generally Andrus is seen as someone who deeply hated the prisoners and was tasked with taking away their defiance. Göring had mounted an arrogant coordination of the prisoners and often demagogued in court; Andrus' food regimen saw him shrink down by 80 lbs. Andrus insisted that inmates rise to their feet upon the arrival of visiting Allied officials. In one instance, Karl Dönitz, who served as Grand Admiral and was head of state after Hitler's death, failed to do so. Andrus shouted, "Get that man up!", and Dönitz reluctantly did so. Dönitz, who was not sentenced to hang, later stated that he had had nightmares in which Andrus would show up to terrorize them.

He spent long hours with his staff planning every last detail of the Nazi prisoners' life. After the suicide of Robert Ley, Andrus arranged anti-suicide cells in which even the tables were designed to collapse under a man's weight. He posted 24-hour guards before each cell and insisted that the prisoners sleep with hands outside the blankets. He required prisoners to take exercise periods during which their cells were searched. He had designed interview booths in which prisoners and visitors could converse with one another without being able to touch hands. However, this system was not foolproof as Hermann Göring managed to commit suicide two hours before his scheduled execution. Andrus always felt cheated by this action of Göring's.

On October 16, 1946, ten prisoners were hanged as a result of the trial. According to American author and Douglas Kelley biographer, Jack El-Hai, Andrus had their bodies taken to the Dachau concentration camp and cremated in the ovens there, then the ashes dumped in the Isar River. Other sources indicate they were incinerated at the Ostfriedhof Cemetery in Munich, before being scattered in the river.

On October 31, 1946, due to the health of his wife, Andrus returned to the United States and was reassigned to Headquarters, Military District of Washington and then as executive officer of 2559th Army Service Unit. He then attended the Strategic Intelligence School, graduating in 1948. He was assigned as military attaché to Israel for the rest of 1948 through 1949. He returned to Washington, D.C., and was reassigned as the military attaché to Brazil on December 16, 1949. Andrus returned to the United States in April 1952 and was officially retired from the U.S. Army on April 30, 1952.

== Post military ==
After retiring from the Army, he lived in Tacoma, Washington. He earned a Bachelor of Arts in Business Administration and later served at the University of Puget Sound as a professor. He was active in the Boy Scouts of America and as a lay preacher for a local church.

He published his memories of the Nuremberg trials as a book titled I Was the Nuremberg Jailer.

He died on February 1, 1977.

== Portrayals ==
Burton C. Andrus has been portrayed by the following actors in film, television and theater productions:

- Michael Ironside in the 2000 Canadian/U.S. T.V. production Nuremberg in which, contrary to history, he attends the executions of the prisoners.
- Des McAleer in the 2006 British television production Nuremberg: Goering's Last Stand
- Anthony Valentine in the 2006 British television docudrama Nuremberg: Nazis on Trial
- John Slattery in the 2025 film Nuremberg

== Bibliography ==
- El-Hai, Jack (2013). The Nazi and the Psychiatrist: Hermann Göring, Dr. Douglas M. Kelley, and a Fatal Meeting of Minds at the End of WWII. New York: PublicAffairs. ISBN 978-1-61039-156-6.
- Burton C. Andrus Collection US Army Heritage and Education Center, Carlisle, Pennsylvania
