= Nuremberg Trials bibliography =

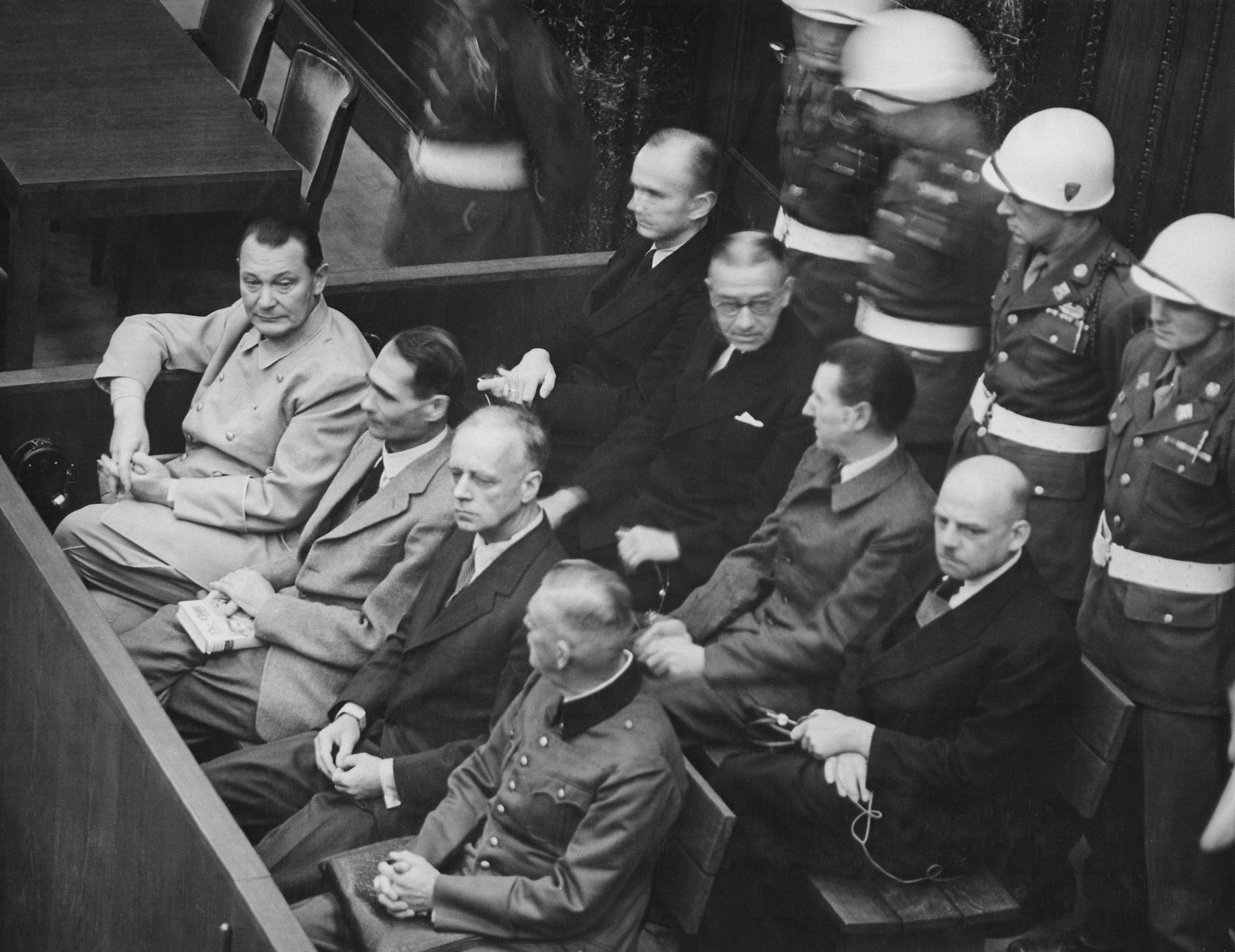
Defendants in the dock

The following is a bibliography of works devoted to the Nuremberg Trials.

The Nuremberg Trials were a series of military tribunals, held by the victorious Allied forces of World War II, most notable for the prosecution of prominent members of the political, military, and economic leadership of the defeated Nazi Germany. The trials were held in the city of Nuremberg, Bavaria, Germany, in 1945–46, at the Palace of Justice. The first and best known of these trials was the Trial of the Major War Criminals before the International Military Tribunal (IMT), which tried 24 of the most important captured leaders of Nazi Germany, though several key architects of the war (such as Adolf Hitler, Heinrich Himmler, and Joseph Goebbels) had committed suicide before the trials began.

- Nurnberg Military Tribunals: Indictments, Case No. 1-12. Office of Military Government for Germany (US). Nuremberg, 1946.
- Allen, Charles R. Nazi War Criminals in America: Facts. Action: The Basic Handbook. Charles R. Allen, Jr. New York: Highgate House, 1985.
- American Bar Association. Section of International and Comparative Law Section. 'Nuremberg revisited: The Judgement of Nuremberg in today's world. S.l.: s.n., 1970.
- Andrus, Burton C. The Infamous of Nuremberg. London: Leslie Frewin, 1969.
- Benton, Wilbourn E. and Georg Grimm, eds. Nuremberg: German Views of the War Trials. Dallas: Southern Methodist University Press, 1970.
- Bernstein, Victor Heine. Final Judgment; the Story of Nuremberg. New York: Boni & Gaer, 1947.
- Blum, Howard. Wanted! The Search for Nazis in America. Quadrangle, New York: The New York Times Book Company, 1977.
- Bosch, William J. Judgment on Nuremberg. Chappel Hill, NC: The University of North Carolina Press, 1970.
- Borkin, Joseph. The Crime and Punishment of I. G. Farben. New York: Free Press, 1978.
- Bower, Tom (1995) [1981]. Blind Eye to Murder: Britain, America and the Purging of Nazi Germany—A Pledge Betrayed (2nd revised ed.). London Little, Brown.
- Buscher, Frank M. The U.S. War Crimes Trial Program in Germany, 1946-1955. New York: Greenwood Press. 1989.
- Calvocoressi, Peter. Nuremberg. New York: MacMillan, 1948.
- Conot, Robert E. Justice at Nuremberg. New York: Harper & Row, 1983.
- Cesarani, David. Justice Delayed. London: Heinemann, 1992.
- Clark, Comer. Eichmann: The Man and His Crime. New York: Ballantine Books, 1960.
- Creel, George. War Criminals and Punishment. New York: Robert M. McBride and Company, 1944.
- Davidson, Eugene. The Trial of the Germans. New York: MacMillan, 1966.
- Dinstein, Yoram. The Defence of 'Obedience to Superior Orders' in International Law. Leyden, Netherlands: A. W. Sijthoff, 1965.
- Du Bois, Josiah Ellis with Edward Johnson. Generals in Grey Suits; The Directors of the International 'I. G. Farben' Cartel, Their Conspiracy and Trial at Nuremberg. London: Bodley Head, 1953.
- Eichmann, Adolf. The Attorney-General of the Government of Israel v. Adolf, the Son of Adolf Karl Eichmann. Jerusalem: [no publisher given],1961.
- Eichmann, Adolf. The Trial of Adolf Eichmann: Record of Proceedings in the District Court of Jerusalem. Jerusalem: Trust for the Publication of the Proceedings of the Eichmann Trial, in co-operation with the Israel State Archives and Yad Vashem, the Holocaust Martyrs' and Heroes' Remembrance Authority, 1992-1993.
- Freiwald, Aaron. The Last Nazi: Josef Schwammberger and the Nazi Past. New York: W.W. Norton, 1994.
- Friedman, Towiah, ed. We Shall Never Forget: An Album of Photographs, Articles and Documents. The Trial of the Nazi Murderer Adolf Eichman[n] in Jerusalem. Haifa, 1991.
- Friedman, Tuviah. The SS and Gestapo Criminals in Radom. Haifa: Institute of Documentation in Israel for the Investigation of Nazi War Crimes, 1992.
- Gilbert, G. M. Nuremberg Diary. New York: Farrar, Straus and Giroux, 1947.
- Glueck, Sheldon. The Nuremberg Trial and Aggressive War. New York: A. A. Knopf, 1946.
- Goldstein, Anatole. Operation Murder. New York: Institute of Jewish Affairs, World Jewish Congress, 1949.
- Goring, Hermann. Trial of the Major War Criminals Before the International Military Tribunal, Nuremberg, 14 November 1945-1 October 1946. Nuremberg: 1947- 49.
- Gollancz, Victor. The Case of Adolf Eichmann. London: The Camelot Press, 1961.
- Goodman, Roger, ed. The First German War Crimes Trial: Chief Judge Walter B. Beals' Desk Notebook of the Doctors' Trial, Held in Nuernberg, Germany, December, 1946 to August, 1947. Salisbury, N. C.: Documentary Publications, 1976(?).
- Gregor, Neil, Haunted City: Nuremberg and the Nazi Past, New Haven: Yale University Press, 2008.
- Halley, Fred G. Preliminary inventory of the records of the United States Counsel for the Prosecution of Axis Criminality. Washington: United States National Archives, 1949.
- Harel, Isser. The House on Garibaldi Street. New York: Viking Press, 1975.
- Heller, Kevin Jon (2011). The Nuremberg Military Tribunals and the Origins of International Criminal Law. Oxford: Oxford University Press.
- Irving, David. Nuremberg: The Last Battle. UK: Focal Point Publications, 1996.
- Jackson, Robert H. The case against the Nazi War criminals. Opening statement for the United States of America. New York: A.A. Knopf, 1946.
- Jackson, Robert H. The Nürnberg Case. New York: Alfred A. Knopf, 1947.
- Jackson, Robert H. Trial of war criminals. Documents: 1. Report of to the President. 2. Agreement establishing an International military tribunal. 3. Indictment. Washington,: U.S. Govt. Print. Off., 1945.
- Jaworski, Leon. After Fifteen Years. Houston: Gulf Publishing, 1961.
- Kahn, Leo. Nuremberg Trials. New York: Ballantine, 1972.
- Klafkowski, Alfons. The Nuremberg Principles and the Development of International Law. Warsaw: Zachodnia Agencja Prasowa, 1966.
- Knieriem, August von. The Nuremberg Trials. Chicago: H. Regnery Co., 1959.
- Kochavi, Arieh J. Prelude to Nuremberg: Allied War Crimes Policy and the Question of Punishment. Chapel Hill: University of North Carolina Press, 1998.
- Levai, Jeno, ed. Eichmann in Hungary: Documents. New York: H. Fertig, 1987.
- Levy, Alan. The Wiesenthal File. London: Constable, 1993.
- Lewis, John R. Uncertain judgment. A bibliography of war crimes trials. Santa Barbara, California; Oxford, England: ABC-Clio, 1979.
- Lyttle, Richard B. Nazi Hunting. New York: Franklin Watts, 1982.
- Malkin, Peter Z., and H. Stein. Eichmann in My Hands. New York: Warner Books, 1990.
- Marrus, Michael R. The Nuremberg War Crimes Trial, 1945–46: A Documentary History. Boston: Bedford Books, 1997.
- Martinez, Tomas Eloy. Peron and the Nazi War Criminals. Working papers (Woodrow Wilson International Center for Scholars. Latin American Program); no. 144. Washington, D.C.: Latin American Program, The Wilson Center, 1984.
- Matas, David. Bringing Nazi War Criminals in Canada to Justice. Downsview, Ontario: League for Human Rights of B'nai B'rith Canada, 1985.
- Matas, David. Justice Delayed: Nazi War Criminals in Canada. Toronto: Summerhill Press, 1987.
- McCarthy, Tom. The King's Men. London; Winchester, Mass.: Pluto Press, 1990.
- McMillan, James. Five Men at Nuremberg. London: Harrap, 1985.
- Mendelsohn, John. Trial by Document: The Use of Seized Records in the United States Proceedings at Nurnberg. New York: Garland, 1988.
- Mitscherlich, Alexander and Fred Mielke. Doctors of Infamy: The Story of the Nazi Medical Crimes; With Statements by Three American Authorities Identified with the Nuremberg Medical Trial. New York: Henry Schuman, 1949.
- Morgan, John Hartman. The Great Assize; An Examination of the Law of the Nuremberg Trials. London: J. Murray, 1948.
- Murray, Michael Patrick. A Study in Public International Law: Comparing the Trial of Adolf Eichmann in Jerusalem with the Trial of the Major German War Criminals at Nuremberg. Ann Arbor, Mich.: University Microforms, 1973.
- Musmanno, Michael A. The Eichmann Kommandos. Philadelphia: Macrae Smith, 1961.
- Neave, Airey. Nuremberg: A Personal Record of the Trial of the Major Nazi War Criminals in 1945-1947. London: Grafton, 1989.
- Nuremberg war crimes trials: records of case 9, United States of America v. Otto Ohlendorf et al., September 15, 1947-April 10, 1948. Compiled by John Mendelsohn. Washington: National Archives and Records Service, General Services Administration, 1978.
- The Nuremberg Trial and International Law. George Ginsburgs and V.N. Kudriavtsev, eds. Boston: M. Nijhoff, 1990.
- Office of United States Chief of Counsel for Prosecution of Axis Criminality. Nazi Conspiracy and Aggression. Washington: U.S. G.P.O., 1947-1948.
- Office of the US High Commissioner for Germany. Landsberg: a Documentary Report. Frankfurt: [s.n., 1951].
- Owen, James. Nuremberg: Evil on Trial. London: Headline, 2006.
- Pearlman, Moshe. The Capture of Adolf Eichmann. London: Weidenfeld and Nicolson, 1961.
- Pearlman, Moshe. The Capture and Trial of Adolf Eichmann. London: Weidenfeld and Nicolson, 1963.
- Persico, Joseph E. Nuremberg: Infamy on Trial. New York: Viking, 1994.
- Pilichowski, Czeslaw. No Time Limit for these Crimes! Warsaw: Interpress, 1980.
- "Punishing the Perpetrators of the Holocaust: The Brandt, Pohl, and Ohlendorf Cases." Volume 17, The Holocaust; Introduction by John Mendelsohn. New York: Garland, 1982.
- Raphael Lemkin's Thoughts on Nazi Genocide: Not Guilty? Steven L. Jacobs, ed. Lewiston, Maine: E. Mellen Press, 1992.
- Report of Robert H. Jackson. United States Representative to the International Conference on Military Trials. London: U.S.G.P.O, 1945.
- Robinson, Jacob. And the Crooked Shall Be Made Straight: The Eichmann Trial, The Jewish Catastrophe, and Hannah Arendt's Narrative. New York: Macmillan, 1965. [in reference to: Arendt, Hannah. Eichmann in Jerusalem: a Report on the Banality of Evil. New York: Penguin Books, 1987, c1964.]
- Rosenbaum, Alan S. Prosecuting Nazi War Criminals. Boulder, CO: Westview Press, 1993.
- Rosenne, Shabtai, ed. 6,000,000 Accusers. Jerusalem: Jerusalem Post, 1961.
- Russell, Edward Frederick Langley. The Scourge of the Swastika. New York: Philosophical Library, 1954.
- Ryan, Allan A. Quiet Neighbors: Prosecuting Nazi War Criminals in America. San Diego: Harcourt Brace Jovanovich, 1984.
- Saidel, Rochelle G. The Outraged Conscience: Seekers of Justice for Nazi War Criminals in America. Albany: State University of New York Press, 1984.
- Smith, Bradley F. The Road to Nuremberg. New York: Basic Books, 1981.
- Smith, Bradley F., ed. The American Road to Nuremberg: The Documentary Record, 1944-1945. Stanford, CA: Hoover Institution Press, 1982.
- Taylor, Telford. Final report to the Secretary of the Army on Nuernberg war crimes trials under Control Council Law no. 10. Washington, D.C.: United States Govt. Print. Off., 1949.
- Taylor, Telford (April 1955). "The Nuremberg Trials". Columbia Law Review. 55 (4): 488–525. JSTOR 1119814.
- Taylor, Telford. Nuremberg and Vietnam. Chicago: Quadrangle, 1970.
- Taylor, Telford. The Anatomy of the Nuremberg Trials: A Personal Memoir. New York: Knopf, 1992.
- Teicholz, Tom. The Trial of Ivan the Terrible. New York: St. Martin's Press, 1990.
- Thompson, Jr., H. K. and Henry Strutz, eds. Doenitz at Nuremberg, a Reappraisal: War Crimes and the Military Professional. New York: Amber, 1976.
- Troper, Harold Martin and Morton Weinfeld. Old Wounds: Jews, Ukrainians and the Hunt for Nazi War Criminals in Canada. Markham, Ont.: Viking, 1988.
- Tusa, Ann and John Tusa. The Nuremberg Trial. New York: Atheneum, 1984.
- Tutorow, Norman E., ed. War crimes, war criminals, and war crime trials. An annotated bibliography and source book. New York: Greenwood Press, 1986.
- United States. Congress. House. Committee on the Judiciary. Subcommittee on Immigration, Refugees, and International Law. GAO Report on Nazi War Criminals in the United States: Oversight Hearing Before the Subcommittee on Immigration, Refugees, and International Law of the Committee on the Judiciary, House of Representatives. Washington: G.P.O., 1986.
- United States National Archives and Records Service. Nuernberg War Crimes Trials: Records of Case 11. Compiled by John Mendelsohn. Washington: National Archives and Records Service, General Services Administration, 1975.
- United States National Archives and Records Service. Records of the United States Nuernberg war crimes trials interrogations, 1946-1949. Washington: National Archives Trust Fund Board, National Archives and Records Service, General Services Administration, 1977.
- von Lang, Jochen, ed. Eichmann Interrogated. New York: Farrar, Straus and Giroux, 1983.
- Wagenaar, Willem A. Identifying Ivan. Cambridge, MA: Harvard University Press, 1988.
- Walters, Guy. Hunting Evil: the Nazi War Criminals Who Escaped and the Hunt to Bring them to Justice. Bantam Books, 2009.
- Watts, Tim J. Nazi War Criminals in the United States: A Bibliography. Monticello, Ill.: Vance Bibliographies, 1989.
- West, Rebecca. A Train of Powder. London: Virago, 1984.
- Wiesenthal, Simon. The Murderers Among Us. Paris: Opera Mundi, 1967.
- Woetzel, Robert K. The Nuremberg Trials in International Law. London: Stevens; New York: Praeger, 1960.
- Zeiger, Henry A., ed. The Case Against Adolf Eichmannn. New York: Signet, 1960.
- Zuroff, Efraim. Occupation: Nazi-Hunter: The Continuing Search for the Perpetrators of the Holocaust. Hoboken, NJ: KTAV, 1994.
- (Under the authority of H.M. Attorney-General, taken from the official transcript) The Trial of German Major War Criminals; Proceedings of the International Military Tribunal Sitting at Nuremberg, Germany: London: H. M. Stationery Office, 1946-51.
List of individual parts (1-22)
1. Part 1: 20 November 1945 to 1 December 1945 (ISBN: T007931356, published 1946)
  Includes Indictment; Presentation of the case by the prosecution
2. Part 2: 3 December 1945 to 14 December 1945 (ISBN: T007931368, published 1946)
  Includes Aggressive action: Czechoslovakia, Poland, Denmark and Norway, Belgium, the Netherlands, Luxembourg, Greece and Yugoslavia, U.S.S.R.
3. Part 3, 17 December 1945 to 4 January 1946 (ISBN: T00793137X, published 1946)
  Includes Criminality of indicted groups; Reich cabinet; S. A.; S. S.; Gestapo and S. D.
4. Part 4, 7 January 1946 to 19 January 1946 (ISBN: T007931344, published 1946)
  Includes Individual responsibility: Hermann Göring; Joachim von Ribbentrop; Wilhelm Keitel; Alfred Jodl; Alfred Rosenberg; Hans Frank; Julius Streicher; Hjalmar Schacht; Walter Funk; Karl Dönitz; Erich Raeder; Baldur von Schirach; Martin Bormann; Artur Seyss-Inquart; Wilhelm Frick
5. Part 5, 21 January 1946 to 1 February 1946 (ISBN: E000037836, published 1946)
  Includes Individual responsibility of: Hans Fritzsche; Franz von Papen; Constantin von Neurath; Germanisation
6. Part 6, 2 February 1946 to 13 February 1946 (ISBN: E000037842, published 1947)
  Includes Germanisation; propaganda; pilage of art works; Responsibility of: Alfred Rosenberg; Fritz Sauckel; Albert Speer; Hermann Göring; Artur Seyss-Inquart; Wilhelm Keitel; Alfred Jodl; Rudolf Hess; crimes against peace
7. Part 7, 14 February 1946 to 26 February 1946 (ISBN: E000037843, published 1947)
  Includes War crimes - crimes against PoWs; extermination; plunder of public and private property; looting and destruction of works of art; destruction of cities and towns; case for the defence of individuals
8. Part 8, 27 February 1946 to 11 March 1946 (ISBN: E000037844, published 1947)
  Includes Extermination of Jews; the case for Göring
9. Part 9, 12 March 1946 to 22 March 1946 (ISBN: E000037845, published 1947) Oral evidence of Göring
10. Part 10, 23 March 1946 to 3 April 1946 (ISBN: E000037846, published 1947)
  Includes The case for Hess, Ribbentrop and Keitel
11. Part 11, 4 April 1946 to 15 April 1946 (ISBN: E000037847, published 1947)
  Includes The case for: Keitel; Ribbentrop; Kaltenbrunner; Rosenberg
12. Part 12, 16 April 1946 to 1 May 1946 (ISBN: E000037848, published 1947)
  Includes The case for: Rosenberg; Frank; Frick; Streicher; Schacht
13. Part 13, 2 May 1946 to 13 May 1946 (ISBN: E000037849, published 1947)
  Includes The case for: Schacht; Funk; Dönitz
14. Part 14, 14 May 1946 to 24 May 1946 (ISBN: E000037850, published 1947)
  Includes The case for: Dönitz; Funk; Räder; Schirach
15. Part 15, 27 May 1946 to 6 June 1946 (ISBN: E000037851, published 1948)
  Includes The case for: Schirach; Sauckel; Jodl
16. Part 16, 7 June 1946 to 19 June 1946 (ISBN: E000037852, published 1948)
  Includes The case for: Jodl (concluded); Seyss-Inquart; Speer (beginning)
17. Part 17, 20 June 1946 to 1 July 1946 (ISBN: E000037853, published 1948)
  Includes The case for: Speer (concluded); Neurath; Fritzsche
18. Part 18, 2 July 1946 to 15 July 1946 (ISBN: E000037854, published 1948)
  Includes The case for Neurath (supplemented); Bormann; concluding speeches
19. Part 19, 16 July 1946 to 27 July 1946 (ISBN: E000037855, published 1949)
  Includes Concluding speeches
20. Part 20, 29 July 1946 to 8 August 1946 (ISBN: E000037856, published 1949)
  Includes Concluding speeches; the case for indicted organisations - Leadership Corps; Gestapo and SD; Reich Cabinet and SS
21. Part 21, 9 August 1946 to 21 August 1946 (ISBN: (unknown), published 1949) Concluding speeches on indicted organisations; Persecution of the Jews; of the Church; Guarding of prisoners of war; of ghettos and concentration camps
22. Part 22, 22 August 1946 to 31 August 1946, 30 September 1946 to 1 October 1946 (ISBN: T007931332, published 1950)
  Includes The case for the General Staff and High Command

== See also ==
- Bibliography of World War II
