= Nuremberg (2025 film) =

American historical drama film by James Vanderbilt

- Theatrical release poster
- Directed by: James Vanderbilt
- Screenplay by: James Vanderbilt
- Based on: The Nazi and the Psychiatrist by Jack El-Hai
- Produced by: Richard Saperstein; Bradley J. Fischer; James Vanderbilt; Frank Smith; William Sherak; Benjamin Tappan; Cherilyn Hawrysh; István Major; George Freeman
- Starring: Russell Crowe; Rami Malek; Leo Woodall; John Slattery; Mark O'Brien; Colin Hanks; Wrenn Schmidt; Lydia Peckham; Richard E. Grant; Michael Shannon
- Cinematography: Dariusz Wolski
- Edited by: Tom Eagles
- Music by: Brian Tyler
- Production companies: Bluestone Entertainment; Walden Media; Mythology Entertainment; Titan Media
- Distributed by: Sony Pictures Classics
- Release dates: September 7, 2025 (TIFF); November 7, 2025 (United States)
- Running time: 148 minutes
- Country: United States
- Languages: English; German
- Budget: $40 million
- Box office: $71.1 million

Nuremberg is a 2025 American psychological thriller historical drama film written, co-produced, and directed by James Vanderbilt. Based on the 2013 book The Nazi and the Psychiatrist by Jack El-Hai, the film follows U.S. Army psychiatrist Douglas Kelley (Rami Malek) seeking to investigate the personalities and monitor the mental status of Hermann Göring (Russell Crowe) and other high-ranking Nazis in preparation for and during the Nuremberg trials. Leo Woodall, John Slattery, Mark O'Brien, Colin Hanks, Wrenn Schmidt, Lydia Peckham, Richard E. Grant, and Michael Shannon have supporting roles in the film.

The film had its world premiere in the Gala Presentations section of the Toronto International Film Festival on September 7, 2025. It was released theatrically in the United States by Sony Pictures Classics on November 7, 2025. The film received generally positive reviews from critics, with particular praise for Crowe's performance.

== Plot ==
On May 7, 1945, one day before Nazi Germany surrenders to the Allies, Reichsmarshall Hermann Göring, Hitler's former second-in-command, surrenders with his family to U.S. forces in Austria. At the same time, Associate Justice Robert Jackson is informed of Göring's arrest, which prompts a discussion with his secretary, Elsie Douglas, about establishing an international tribunal to charge the surviving Nazi leadership with war crimes. Douglas is conservative, noting that such potential action has no legally-established international precedent; however, Jackson is enthusiastic, envisioning the tribunal as an opportunity of establishing such precedent. Initially, the U.S. is reluctant to support Jackson's plans, and favors summary executions instead; however, Jackson persists by winning the support of Pope Pius XII by leveraging his knowledge of the latter's controversial relationship with the Nazi regime.

Elsewhere, U.S. Army psychiatrist Lieutenant Col. Douglas Kelley is summoned to Bad Mondorf, Luxembourg, to evaluate the mental health of 22 Nazi leaders in Allied custody, including Göring, who have been selected for prosecution. Reporting to the warden, Colonel Burton Andrus, Kelley begins his assignment with the assistance of an interpreter, Sergeant Howard Triest. Initial meetings with Göring are civil; however, other prisoners, such as Robert Ley and Julius Streicher, react with contempt. Personally, Kelley appraises Göring as intelligent, yet highly narcissistic, and plans to use his notes of those interactions to write a tell-all book for personal profit.

In due course, Jackson and British barrister Sir David Maxwell Fyfe are made prosecuting counsels for the newly established International Military Tribunal in Nuremberg, Germany, which in turn charges the detainees with crimes against peace, war crimes, crimes against humanity and conspiracy. In the lead-up to the trial, Kelley and Göring interact warmly, with Göring going so far as to help Kelley examine former Deputy Führer Rudolf Hess, in exchange for being allowed to write to his wife Emmy and daughter Edda. Kelley also develops a rapport with them, acting as a courier between them and Göring. In private, Kelley is approached by Jackson to report the prisoners' legal defense to him in order to shape the prosecution.

Before the trial can commence, Ley commits suicide by strangling himself in his cell, leading Andrus to summon psychologist Gustave Gilbert to provide a second opinion. At the trial's beginning, Jackson delivers a strong opening statement highlighting the need for accountability, while Göring is silenced and instead ordered to enter a plea; he and the other prisoners plead "not guilty". During adjournments, Kelley learns that Göring's family had been arrested in connection with his reported art thefts and requests Andrus to intervene; Göring later learns of the development from Gilbert.

When the trial recommences, the prosecution shows footage of the regime's atrocities committed inside its concentration camps, causing an upset Kelley to confront Göring, who had previously denied any knowledge of such actions. Göring stands by the claims of his unawareness, and resorts to denying the atrocities or comparing them with alleged crimes committed by the Allies. Dismayed, Kelley proceeds to get drunk and unwittingly reveals his private discussions with Göring to Lila, a journalist with The Boston Globe, who subsequently publishes the information. Infuriated, Andrus relieves Kelley and orders him out, but not before revealing that he was able to get Emmy and Edda released. While leaving, Triest reveals to Kelley that he is a German-born Jew, and that while his younger sister escaped to Switzerland, his parents were murdered by the Nazis in 1942.

Triest warns that the regime's cruelty was unchallenged because of a general impassivity towards evil, which compels Kelley to stay and instead submit all of his private notes on Göring to Jackson and Fyfe, predicting that Göring plans to use the trial to defend the regime's conduct. As Kelley predicted, Göring evades Jackson's cross-examination, and proceeds to declare that his decree of the Final Solution was actually intended as a complete solution focused on the emigration of Germany's Jews rather than their extermination. In turn, Jackson's ire towards Göring earns him a stern rebuke by the tribunal, which prompts Fyfe to take over. Fyfe exploits Göring's vanity and goads him into overtly admitting his continued loyalty to Hitler, which finally corners him. At the trial's conclusion, Göring is sentenced to death by hanging.

Kelley pays Göring a final visit before leaving, where he comes to terms with Göring's true nature. On October 15, 1946, the night before his scheduled execution, Göring commits suicide by ingesting cyanide, much to Andrus's anger. (Note: In the film, Göring makes a cyanide pill appear in a fashion similar to the magic tricks Kelley has showed him; in real life, the matter of how Göring acquired cyanide remains up to speculation.) The remaining executions proceed as scheduled, with Streicher suffering a nervous breakdown. Triest, who had intended to reveal his Jewish heritage to Streicher before his execution, instead chooses to gently assist him to the gallows. The execution goes poorly, with Streicher having to be weighed down on the noose to die.

Kelley, traumatized by his experiences at Nuremberg, returns to the U.S. and publishes his tell-all, 22 Cells in Nuremberg, which he has trouble promoting. The film's intertitles reveal that Kelley succumbed to alcoholism and spent the rest of his life in vain warning about the possibility of a future regime similar to the Nazis, before committing suicide in 1958 by ingesting cyanide. Triest managed to reunite with his sister; while Jackson's prosecutorial efforts at Nuremberg laid the foundation for international prosecution of war crimes.

== Cast ==
- Rami Malek as Douglas Kelley
- Russell Crowe as Hermann Göring
- Leo Woodall as Sergeant Howie Triest
- John Slattery as Burton C. Andrus
- Mark O'Brien as John Amen
- Colin Hanks as Gustave Gilbert
- Wrenn Schmidt as Elsie Douglas
- Lydia Peckham as Lila
- Michael Shannon as Robert H. Jackson
- Richard E. Grant as Sir David Maxwell Fyfe
- Lotte Verbeek as Emmy Göring
- Andreas Pietschmann as Rudolf Hess
- Steven Pacey as George C. Marshall
- Paul Antony-Barber as Francis Biddle
- Jeremy Wheeler as Edmund Phipps-Hornby
- Wolfgang Cerny as Baldur von Schirach
- Giuseppe Cederna as Pope Pius XII
- Dan Cade as Corporal Jones
- Donald Sage Mackay as J. William Fulbright
- Dieter Riesle as Julius Streicher
- Wayne Brett as Colonel Franks
- Gyula Mesterházy as Erich Raeder
- Sam Newman as Alben W. Barkley
- Philippe Jacq as Günther von Rohrscheidt
- Peter Jordan as Karl Dönitz
- Tom Keune as Robert Ley
- Blake Kubena as Sergeant Powell
- Michael Sheldon as Geoffrey Lawrence
- Fleur Bremmer as Edda Göring

== Production ==
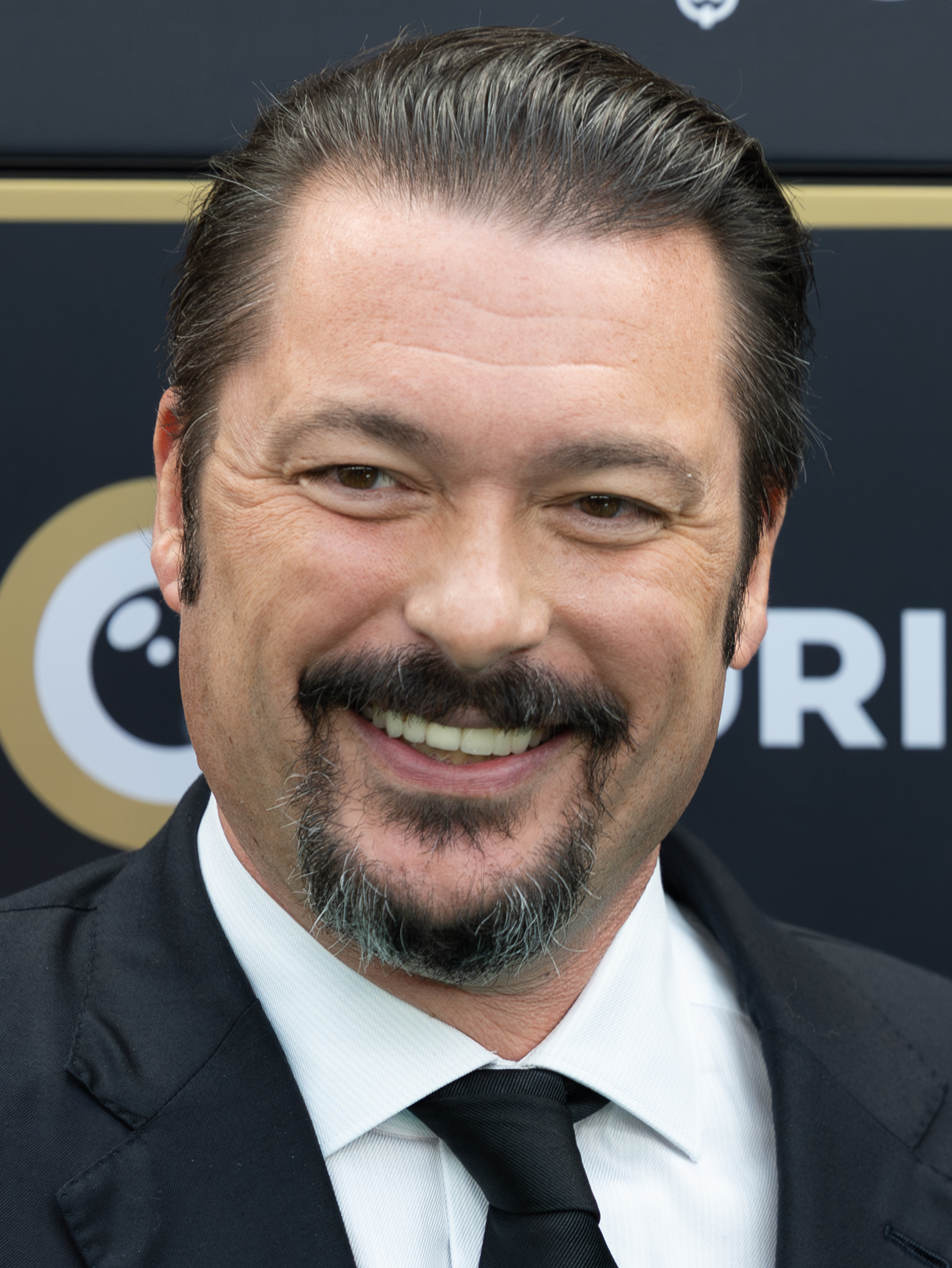
Vanderbilt at the 2025 Zurich Film Festival

In December 2023, it was announced that James Vanderbilt was set to write and direct the film, with Rami Malek, Russell Crowe and Michael Shannon starring. Additional casting with Richard E. Grant, Leo Woodall, John Slattery and Colin Hanks was announced in January and February 2024.

Filming began in Budapest, Hungary in February 2024 and wrapped by May 2024.

== Release ==
In June 2025, Sony Pictures Classics acquired North American and worldwide airline rights to the film and scheduled a release for it in the U.S. on November 7, 2025. The film's early special release with a Q-and-A session with Vanderbilt and Crowe was on October 27, 2025. At the premiere in Toronto, it received a four-minute standing ovation, one of TIFF's longest standing ovations ever.

== Reception ==
On the review aggregator website Rotten Tomatoes, 72% of 202 critics' reviews are positive, with an average rating of 6.7/10. The website's consensus reads: "Driven by a commanding performance from Russell Crowe, Nuremberg is a handsomely crafted historical drama, but its measured pacing and emotional restraint keep it from fully realizing the complexity of its subject." Metacritic, which uses a weighted average, assigned the film a score of 61 out of 100, based on 37 critics, indicating "generally favorable" reviews.

Matt Zoller Seitz of RogerEbert.com gave the film three out of four stars, writing: "It's a solid film of [a] kind that used to be more common: an earnest, unpretentious Oscar Movie that wants to be seen by everyone, and consequently doesn't try to be too complex or arty. It wants to educate and inspire as well as entertain, and isn't shy about that ambition".

Writing for The Daily Beast, Nick Schrager found the film to be flawed in spite of the star actors in the film, and critiqued Vanderbilt's direction by stating: "Nuremberg is constructed like an old-fashioned awards-bait period piece, complete with trailer-ready lines of dialogue that put a neat-and-tidy button on scenes. There's a mechanical quality to Vanderbilt's plotting that negates the unexpected and enlightening".

In a review for The Guardian, Peter Bradshaw rated the film two out of five stars, noting: "All of these actors do their best, but the figure of Kelley himself is a ridiculous cartoon". He cited Rami Malek's performance as "deeply silly". Katie Walsh of the Los Angeles Times described the film as "well-intentioned and elucidating despite some missteps".

=== Accolades ===
Award	Date of ceremony	Category	Recipient(s)	Result	Ref.
AACTA International Awards	February 6, 2026	Best Film	Nuremberg	Nominated	
AACTA International Awards	February 6, 2026	Best Actor	Russell Crowe	Nominated	
AARP Movies for Grownups Awards	January 10, 2026	Best Supporting Actor	Michael Shannon	Nominated	
AARP Movies for Grownups Awards	January 10, 2026	Best Screenwriter	James Vanderbilt	Nominated	
AARP Movies for Grownups Awards	January 10, 2026	Best Ensemble	Nuremberg	Nominated	
AARP Movies for Grownups Awards	January 10, 2026	Best Period Film	Nuremberg	Nominated	
Artios Awards	February 26, 2026	Feature: Studio or Independent: Drama	John Papsidera and Anna Kennedy; Emily Bohbrink (associate casting director); Francesco Vedovati (location casting director)	Nominated	
Camerimage	November 22, 2025	Golden Frog	Dariusz Wolski	Nominated	
Cinema for Peace Awards	February 16, 2026	Cinema for Peace Dove for The Most Valuable Film of the Year	Nuremberg	Nominated	
Golden Trailer Awards	May 29, 2025	Best Foreign Drama	TNT4 Channel	Won	
Golden Trailer Awards	May 29, 2025	Best Foreign Independent Trailer	TNT4 Channel	Nominated	
Golden Trailer Awards	May 29, 2025	Best Foreign Music	TNT4 Channel	Nominated	
Golden Trailer Awards	May 29, 2025	Best Foreign Thriller	TNT4 Channel	Nominated	
Golden Trailer Awards	May 29, 2025	Most Original Foreign Trailer	TNT4 Channel	Nominated	
Golden Trailer Awards	May 28, 2026	Best Drama	"The Tribunal" (Sony Pictures Classics / LIVEBAD Creative)	Nominated	
Golden Trailer Awards	May 28, 2026	Best Drama TV Spot	"Never Happen Again" (Sony Pictures Classics / LIVEBAD Creative)	Nominated	
Golden Trailer Awards	May 28, 2026	Best Independent Trailer	"The Tribunal" (Sony Pictures Classics / LIVEBAD Creative)	Nominated	
Golden Trailer Awards	May 28, 2026	Home Ent: Best Digital – Drama	"Strap Yourself In" (Sony Pictures Classics / LIVEBAD Creative)	Won	
Heartland International Film Festival	October 20, 2025	Overall Narrative Audience Choice Award	Nuremberg	Honored	
International Film Music Critics Association	February 26, 2026	Best Original Score for a Drama Film	Brian Tyler	Nominated	
New York Film Critics Online	December 15, 2025	Best Picture	Nuremberg	Nominated	
San Sebastián International Film Festival	September 27, 2025	Ateneo Guipuzcoano Award	James Vanderbilt	Honored	
Washington D.C. Area Film Critics Association	December 7, 2025	Joe Barber Award for Best Portrayal of Washington, D.C.	Nuremberg	Nominated	
Zurich Film Festival	September 27, 2025	Lifetime Achievement Award (Golden Eye)	Russell Crowe	Honored	

== See also ==
- Judgment at Nuremberg, a 1961 American film
- Nuremberg, a 2000 TV mini series also focusing on the psychology behind the actions of the Nazis, starring Alec Baldwin as Jackson and Brian Cox as Göring
- Nuremberg, a 2023 Russian film
