= Michael Wadding =

Michael Wadding may refer to:

- Michael Wadding (television), British television writer, director and producer
- Michael Wadding (priest) (1591–1644), Irish Roman Catholic priest and missionary
- Michael Wadding (referee), Irish hurling referee
