= John C. Woods =

American executioner (1911–1950)

John Clarence Woods
- Born: June 5, 1911; Wichita, Kansas, United States
- Died: July 21, 1950 (aged 39); Eniwetok Atoll, Marshall Islands
- Burial place: Toronto Township Cemetery, Toronto, Kansas, U.S.
- Military career
- Branch: United States Navy (1929–30); United States Army (1943–50)
- Rank: Master sergeant
- Units: 37th Engineer Combat Battalion; 7th Engineer Brigade
- Known for: Nuremberg executions
- Conflicts: World War II

John Clarence Woods (June 5, 1911 – July 21, 1950) was a United States Army master sergeant who, with Joseph Malta, carried out the Nuremberg executions of ten former top leaders of Nazi Germany on October 16, 1946, after they were sentenced to death at the Nuremberg trials. Time magazine credited him with 347 executions to that date during a 15-year career.

== Biography ==
Woods was born in Wichita, Kansas. Before being inducted into the United States Army in August 1943, he was working part-time at a feed-store in Eureka, Kansas, when he was registered for Selective Service in 1940. He married a nurse, Hazel Chilcott, but had no children.

Before D-Day, U.S. military executions by hanging in the European Theater of Operations occurred in Southern England only and were performed by the civilian executioner Thomas Pierrepoint, with assistance by Albert Pierrepoint (his nephew) and other British personnel. When in autumn of 1944 military executions by hanging were scheduled in France, the Army looked for a volunteer enlisted hangman and found Woods, who falsely claimed previous experience as assistant hangman in two cases in Texas and two in Oklahoma. He later told newspaper reporters that his career as an executioner had started when he "attended a hanging as a witness, and the hangman asked me if I wouldn't mind helping." There is no evidence that the U.S. Army made any attempt to verify Woods's claims—if they had checked, it would have been easy to prove that he was lying; the states of Texas and Oklahoma had both switched to electrocution during the period he claimed to be a hangman. The last hanging in Texas took place in August 1923 when Woods would have been twelve. Oklahoma did not carry out hangings during the relevant period, the last one taking place three months before Woods was born. There was a single hanging in 1936 under federal jurisdiction, while all other executions in Oklahoma between 1915 and 1966 were carried out by electric chair.

Woods served the U.S. military as the primary executioner in the hangings of 34 U.S. soldiers at various locations in France over 1944–1945 and assisted in at least three others. U.S. Army reports suggest that Woods participated in at least 11 bungled hangings of U.S. soldiers between 1944 and 1946.

Woods also participated in the execution of about 45 war criminals at various locations which included Rheinbach, Bruchsal, Landsberg, and Nuremberg. Donald E. Wilkes Jr., a professor of law at the University of Georgia Law School, wrote that many of the Nazis executed at Nuremberg fell from the gallows with a drop insufficient to snap their necks, resulting in their death by strangulation, which in some cases lasted up to 24 minutes.

Such suspicions were voiced at the time. According to a Time magazine article published just 12 days after the executions, it was alleged that they "had been cruelly bungled", with reporter Cecil Catling, "a veteran crime reporter and an expert on hangings" declaring "that there was not enough room for the men to drop, which would mean that their necks had not been properly broken and that they must have died of slow strangulation. In addition, Catling claimed that they were not properly tied, so that some hit the platform with their heads as they went down and their noses were torn off." Although the "U.S. Army denied his story", photographs of some of the deceased, such as Wilhelm Frick and Wilhelm Keitel, clearly displayed "battered and bloody faces." In the case of Julius Streicher, reporter Howard K. Smith wrote that the initial drop was not fatal, and that "witnesses could hear him groaning", upon which "Woods came down from the platform and disappeared behind the black curtain that concealed the dying man. Abruptly the groans ceased and the rope stopped moving. Smith and the other witnesses were convinced that Woods had grabbed Streicher and pulled down hard, strangling him." According to Lieutenant Stanley Tilles, who was charged with co-ordinating the hangings at Nuremberg, "Woods had deliberately placed the coils of Streicher's noose off-center" to ensure that he would not experience a quick death. Smith believed that "Woods hated Germans", and that "a small smile cross[ed] his lips as he pulled the hang-man's handle." An official medical inspection of the process was "said to have revealed a shambles".

After the Nuremberg executions, Woods stated:

I hanged those ten Nazis ... and I am proud of it ... I wasn't nervous. ... A fellow can't afford to have nerves in this business. ... I want to put in a good word for those G.I.s who helped me ... they all did well. ... I am trying to get [them] a promotion. ... The way I look at this hanging job, somebody has to do it. I got into it kind of by accident, years ago in the States.

Woods later claimed in newspaper interviews that he "never saw a hanging go off any better", and that the assignment at Nuremberg was one he "really wanted to do", so much so that he had apparently insisted on remaining in Germany rather than returning home. He also boasted of receiving a $2,500 (equivalent to $41,276 in 2025) offer from a man in Havana, Cuba, for one of the ropes used during the executions (although the ropes, hoods and other such items had already been burned). Although he described them as arrogant men who "really deserved hanging", he also claimed that the Nuremberg defendants had died bravely. Woods also alleged that after he began hanging German war criminals, attempts had been made on his life, with Woods claiming that "somebody tried to poison me in Germany" (although in reality this may have been no more than unintentional food poisoning contracted "in an Army mess") and also that someone had shot at him in Paris, "but the poison only made me sick and the bullet missed me." He reportedly went around armed with two .45 caliber pistols, and remarked loudly that: "If some German thinks he wants to get me, he better make sure he does it with his first shot, because I was raised with a pistol in my hand."

Woods "announced his retirement from being an executioner six days after his wife found out about it"; apparently, he had not informed her or his mother about what he was doing. They had thought that he was "assisting Heidelberg engineers in Germany." However, Woods also told reporters that he might return to Germany in some capacity, stating that there were more than 120 war criminals still waiting to be hanged, including 43 sentenced for their part in the Malmedy massacre. Claiming that he "had some buddies killed in that massacre", he boasted that he would come back "just to get even for them."

On July 21, 1950, Woods was accidentally electrocuted when he tried to change a light bulb while standing in a pool of water. He was buried in Toronto Township Cemetery, Toronto, Kansas.

== See also ==
- List of executioners
