= Nuremberg: Nazis on Trial =

BBC documentary film series

- DVD cover
- Also known as: The Nuremberg Trial: Inside the Nazi Mind
- Genre: Docudrama
- Written by: Nigel Paterson, Paul Bradshaw, Michael Wadding
- Directed by: Paul Bradshaw; Nigel Paterson; Michael Wadding
- Starring: Nathaniel Parker; Robert Pugh; Ben Cross
- Narrated by: Matthew Macfadyen
- Composer: Glenn Keiles
- Country of origin: United Kingdom
- Original language: English
- No. of seasons: 1
- No. of episodes: 3

Production
- Producers: Detlef Siebert; Dominic Sutherland
- Editors: Ben Giles, Alan Lygo, Ged Murphy
- Running time: 180 minutes

Original release
- Network: BBC Two
- Release: 25 September – 9 October 2006

Nuremberg: Nazis on Trial, is a BBC documentary film series consisting of three one-hour films that re-enact the Nuremberg War Trials of Albert Speer, Hermann Göring, and Rudolf Hess. They were broadcast on BBC Two in 2006 to coincide with the 60th anniversary of the trials. In 2015, American Heroes Channel aired the film under an alternate title, "Nuremberg: Nazi Judgement Day".

== Production ==
Written by directors Nigel Paterson, Paul Bradshaw and Michael Wadding, the three films were produced and shown by the BBC to commemorate the 60th anniversary of the Nuremberg War Trials. Each film centred on a different one of the senior Nazis that were on trial and tells the story of their crime and punishment.

The films employ the dual docudrama format interweaving contemporary interviews and archive footage with dramatic re-enactments of the events. The cross-cutting between footage of the real trial and the meticulously researched reconstructions garnered critical acclaim and a BAFTA nomination for the editor, Ben Giles.

The series was filmed with the Panasonic SDX 900 DVCPRO 50 professional camcorder.

== Performers ==
- Matthew Macfadyen as Narrator voice
- Ben Cross as Rudolf Hess
- Nathaniel Parker as Albert Speer
- Robert Pugh as Hermann Göring
- Adam Godley as Gustave Gilbert
- Colin Stinton as Justice Robert H. Jackson
- Anthony Valentine as Col. Burton C. Andrus
- Richard Durden as Lord Justice Geoffrey Lawrence
- Tim Woodward as Col. John Amen
- Julian Wadham as David Maxwell Fyfe
- Paul Hickey as Mervyn Griffith-Jones
- Rupert Vansittart as Thomas J. Dodd
- Stuart Bunce as Maj. Douglas Kelley
- Paul Brennen as Fritz Sauckel

== Participants ==
- Prof. Richard Overy: University of Exeter
- Richard Sonnenfeldt: Chief Interpreter
- Henry T. King: US Prosecution Team
- Roger Barrett: US Prosecution Team
- Whitney Harris: US Prosecutor
- John E. Dolibois: US Army Intelligence
- Emilio Di Palma: Prison Guard
- Bud Jones: Prison Guard
- Ernest Michel: Auschwitz Survivor
- Harold Burson: Radio Journalist
- Prof. Robert Gellately: Historian
- Prof. Edgar Jones: Psychopathologist
- Prof. Simon Wessely: Psychiatrist

== Reception ==
Joe Joseph writing in The Times recommended the diligently researched series. Joseph commended the casting of Nathaniel Parker, Robert Pugh and Ben Cross alongside a vast array of costumed extras. He also admires the high production values that use meticulously constructed sets and washed out colours to match modern reconstructions to archive footage. Joseph however considered the production failed to achieve the right balance within the docudrama format.

David Chater, writing in the same paper, went even further stating that the strength of the series rests in the contribution from eyewitnesses and historians and it is pointless to go to all the trouble and expense of the dramatic re-constructions. Although he commended the series for shedding light on the crimes of individual members of the Nazi party and some of the personal, moral and political issues that surrounded the trials, he considered that it would have been far more effective as a straight documentary.

Harry Venning, writing in The Stage, proclaimed the series a cut above the standard drama-doc and complemented the sparing use of claustrophobically set dramatic recreations and Nathaniel Parker's suggestive performance but proclaiming that it was Robert Pugh's sneering, swaggering, unrepentant portrayal of Göring that stole the show.

Andrew Anthony, writing in The Observer, commended the use of the dual docudrama format for examining the enigmatic Albert Speer in the first episode. Anthony also extols Nathaniel Parker's cool portrayal of the "Nazi who said sorry".

Editor Ben Giles was nominated for his work on the show in the Best Editing - Factual category at the 2007 British Academy Television Craft Awards.

=== Episode one: Albert Speer ===
Episode one was broadcast on 25 September 2006 and drew 2.1 million viewers (9% audience share)

Clive Morgan writing in The Daily Telegraph called the film an adroitly drawn, grimly fascinating hour and claimed the film did a rather good job of sifting the complexities and ambiguities of Speer from a welter of courtroom detail and other historical records and commend it for cutting cleverly from actual to dramatised footage.

David Chater continues his criticism in The Times by proclaiming the dramatic reconstruction elements of this episode worse than pointless due to Nathaniel Parker's unconvincing portrayal in the lead role.

=== Episode two: Hermann Goering ===
Episode two was broadcast on 2 October 2006 and drew 1.9 million viewers (8% audience share).

Chris Riley writing in The Daily Telegraph observed how the charismatic figure of Göring bestrides the entire series as he did at the trial itself. Riley also commended the recollections and pithy insights of the psychologist Gustave Gilbert that dot the episode.

Chater proclaimed that not even a fine performance from Robert Pugh and immense pains that have been taken to ensure its authenticity can make the dramatisation feel real.

=== Episode three: Rudolf Hess ===
Episode three was broadcast on 9 October 2006 and drew 1.8 million viewers.

Peter Naughton writing in The Daily Telegraph commends the film for excellently blending dramatised reconstructions and newsreel footage.

The Times dismissed the film as a hammy dramatisation.

== Plot summary ==
=== Episode one: Albert Speer ===
Episode one questions whether the "nazi who said sorry", whose actions were the most far-reaching and significant of the trial, was a troubled soul seeking forgiveness of the German people or the mastermind of a cynical strategy that fooled the world?

The film begins with a re-enactment of Speer's arrest, which US prosecutor Henry King says came as a surprise to the aristocratic Architect who became Hitler's armaments minister. Following the arrest, he is indicted of war crimes and transferred to Nuremberg Prison with Hermann Göring and other senior Nazis. Speer is confronted with full crimes of the Nazis and says he will admit common responsibility against the advice of his Defence attorney and US Army intelligence psychologist Capt. Gustav Gilbert takes an interest.

Chief Prosecutor Justice Robert Jackson is concerned about the public trial and expresses the value of a single witness willing to accept culpability. Fellow defendant Fritz Sauckel incriminates Speer in the importation of slave labour. Speer admits to giving little thought to the legality or morality of this. Professor Richard Overy proposes that Speer saw his only chance at salvation was to establish a relationship with the Western prosecutors.

Speer's defence put forward their client's countermandment of Hitler's scorched Earth orders and plot on the Führer's life breaking the Nazis' common front and infuriating its leader Göring. Speer explains to Gilbert his plot to gas Hitler which US prosecutor Whitney Harris admits was risky but half-hearted. Gilbert realises Speer can be used by the prosecution, and on his advice, isolates Göring who prison guard Emilio Di Palma says was worshipped by the other defendants.

In the dock, Göring launches a devastatingly successful defence against cross-examination and Speer begins to waver. Jackson agrees to cross-examine Speer himself and according to Overy gives the defendant an easy ride. Harris says Speer gave the prosecution what they needed by freely acknowledging his responsibility and denouncing the crimes of Hitler and the Nazi regime. As a result, Sauckel is sentenced to death while Speer gets only a 20-year prison sentence.

US Army intelligence officer John Dolibois concludes that Speer used his charisma very effectively, persuading a lot of people and pulling the wool over their eyes.

=== Episode two: Hermann Goering ===
Episode two questions whether Hitler's chosen successor could succeed where he had failed by re-igniting Nazi pride from the witness box.

The film begins with a re-enactment of the press conference organized following the surrender of Hermann Göring at which he expresses surprise that he is to be indicted for war crimes. The regime's top soldier had a fun-loving public image that concealed the brutality of the founder of the Gestapo. US Army intelligence psychologist Capt. Gustav Gilbert hears from the prisoner how he knows he will hang but first will convince the German people that what he did was for them.

The suicides of Hitler and Himmler have left Göring the highest-ranking Nazi survivor, and Prison Commandant Colonel Burton Andrus confiding in Gilbert that without him they have no case. Prison guard Bud Jones tells of the extraordinary procedures put in place following the suicide of Robert Ley. Gilbert is assigned prisoner liaison to watch over the inmates, and Göring confides in him his wish to be remembered as a great man.

As the trial begins the defendants, led by Göring, are initially jubilant but US prosecutor Whitney Harris tells that a film on the camps brings home to them their crimes. Chief Prosecutor Justice Robert Jackson's cross-examination of Göring collapses into farce thanks to the defendant's glib responses which Professor Richard Overy reveals put the future of the trial in doubt. Radio Journalist Harold Burson explains British Prosecutor David Maxwell-Fyfe rescued the trial by changing tack and putting Göring on the ropes.

Harris explains that the belated capture of Auschwitz Commandant SS Lt-Col. Rudolf Höss finally revealed the true extent of the crimes and led to the defendants giving up the fight. Overy explains that Göring's united front collapsed as one by one the defendants denounce Hitler and even Göring himself. Göring is subsequently sentenced to death by hanging. He appeals against the hanging, preferring a soldier's death by shooting, but this is denied; on the night of his execution, he takes his own life with a cyanide capsule.

Overy concludes that with Göring sentenced and the myth that Hitler destroyed the Third Reich was finally laid to rest.

=== Episode three: Rudolf Hess ===
Episode three explores the mind of one of the most fanatical of all Nazis and the insight that gives into the psychology of dictatorship.

Hess is brought to Nuremberg from the UK where he had flown 4 years earlier much to the bemusement of the British. Overy explains that they must have quickly realised he was not normal. In the intervening time Hess's mental state has further deteriorated and when interviewed by Chief Interrogator Colonel John Amen proclaims amnesia. Chief Interpreter Richard Sonnenfeldt explains that they brought in Göring to confront Hess but that he too failed to make an impression.

The prosecutors fear Hess may be unfit for trial and Prison Psychiatrist Major Douglas Kelley is assigned to assess him. US Army Intelligence officer John Dolibois recalls that Kelley concludes from a Rorschach Inkblot test that Hess is not a true amnesiac but may have even convinced himself. US prosecutor Whitney Harris explains how after the trial begins with Hess pleading "Nein" the defendant claims to have been faking all along. However Sonnenfeldt points out that as the trial continues Hess's behaviour becomes increasingly bizarre and paranoid.

Psychopathologist Prof. Edgar Jones proposes Hess's behaviour patterns may be his way of escaping reality as he is forced to face the extent of the atrocities and choose between accepting his part of the blame or forsaking his Führer. However, as history Professor Robert Gellatel explains it is difficult to construct a case against Hess as he was imprisoned in England when the worst of the atrocities were carried out so British Prosecutor Mervyn Griffith-Jones must argue a conspiracy charge linking the pre-1939 persecutions to the post-1939 atrocities and a crimes against peace charge proving the flight to Scotland was merely a ruse.

Meanwhile, an increasingly unstable Hess is preparing to make an explosive revelation. Prisoner liaison Gustave M. Gibert discovers what this may be in Hess's British medical records where he talks of being hypnotised by a secret Jewish drug. In his final statement Hess makes a long rambling speech, which Gilbert explains blames the Jews for their own elimination, ending with his exultation of the Führer. Hess is consequently sentenced to life imprisonment.

In prison, Hess drafts a letter proclaiming himself Führer of the Fourth Reich and becomes an icon of the neo-Nazi movement.
