= Dominic Sutherland =

English director & producer (born 1972)

- Born: 25 September 1972 (age 53); London, England
- Education: University of Edinburgh
- Occupations: Managing director, NextShoot Ltd
- Website: www.nextshoot.com

Dominic Sutherland (born 1972) is an English television director and producer.

== Biography ==
Sutherland studied history and literature at the University of Edinburgh.

== Career ==
=== BBC ===
Sutherland began his career at the BBC on the production team of the 2002 documentary series Battle of the Atlantic.

In 2003, he directed Secrets of Leadership - Churchill before working as a director on the 2005 documentary series Auschwitz: The Nazis and the 'Final Solution', for which he shared the Grierson Award for Best Historical Programme.

In 2005, he produced and directed A Very British Olympics, which was nominated for RTS and Grierson awards and which won two FOCAL awards, for the BBC4 Season The Lost Decade.

He was a producer and director on the 2006 series Nuremberg: Nazis on Trial, a docudrama which recounted the Nuremberg Trials of prominent Nazi war criminals.

In 2007, he produced and directed two documentaries for the documentary series Timewatch (episodes "Hijack" and "The Greatest Knight"), and in 2008, produced and directed an episode for the BBC documentary series Inside the Medieval Mind, Sex, about sex, love and relationships.

=== NextShoot Ltd ===
Dominic left the BBC to set up NextShoot Ltd, a London-based production company, in 2009 with video content management expert, Mike MacNamara.

==== Brand and Organisation Work ====
Since 2010, Sutherland, in his role as Managing Director of NextShoot, has guided the creation of videos and stills for a number or businesses and organisations. These have included such companies as HarperCollins, Barclays, IBM, Argos, John Lewis, Mitel, Bloomberg, World Bank Group, Jaguar Land Rover, Arup Group, CBRE Group, Mondelez International, and Pfizer.

==== Small and Medium-Sized Enterprises ====
Sutherland was also responsible for NextShoot's creation of over 8,000 videos for Yell.com's new video channel in seven months using over 300 filmmakers in the UK.

==== Arts and Cultural Work ====
Sutherland has also worked with many cultural organisations in museums. He took an active role in the production of online content for the National Gallery's recent exhibitions of Impressionist works and a retrospective of the Spanish painter Joaquín Sorolla, as well as producing films about contemporary artists Christo and Olafur Eliasson.

NextShoot has also developed educational content for the Royal Shakespeare Company.

== Filmography ==
- 2002: Battle of the Atlantic, assistant producer
- 2002 The New Detectives: Case Studies in Forensic Science: Murder for Hire, assistant producer
- 2003: Churchill - Secrets of Leadership, director
- 2005: Auschwitz: The Nazis and the 'Final Solution', documentary and graphics director
- 2005: A Very British Olympics, producer and director
- 2006: Nuremberg: Nazis on Trial, producer
- 2007: Timewatch: Hijack & The Greatest Knight, producer and director
- 2008: Inside the Medieval Mind, producer and director

== See also ==
- NextShoot
