= Gustave Gilbert =

American psychologist

- Gilbert c. 1950
- Born: Gustave Mark Gilbert; September 30, 1911; New York City, US
- Died: February 6, 1977 (aged 65); Manhasset, New York, US
- Spouse: Matilda Gilbert
- Children: 3

Academic background
- Education: Columbia University
- Thesis: Dynamic Psychophysics and the Phi Phenomenon (1939)

Academic work
- Discipline: Psychology
- Institutions: Michigan State College; Long Island University
- Notable works: Nuremberg Diary (1947); The Psychology of Dictatorship (1950)
- Military career
- Branch: United States Army
- Rank: Captain

Gustave Mark Gilbert (September 30, 1911 – February 6, 1977) was an American psychologist best known for his writings containing observations of high-ranking Nazi leaders during the Nuremberg trials. His 1950 book The Psychology of Dictatorship was an attempt to profile the Nazi German dictator Adolf Hitler using as reference the testimonials of Hitler's closest generals and commanders. Gilbert's published work is still a subject of study in many universities and colleges, especially in the field of psychology.

== Early life and education ==
Gilbert was born in the state of New York in 1911, the son of Jewish-Austrian immigrants. He won a scholarship from the School for Ethical Culture at the College Town Center in New York. He attended the City College of New York where he majored in German before switching to psychology. In 1939, Gilbert obtained his PhD degree in psychology from Columbia University. Gilbert also held a diploma from the American Board of Examiners in professional psychology.

During World War II, Gilbert was commissioned with the rank of First Lieutenant. Because of his knowledge of German, he was sent overseas as a translator.

== Nuremberg trials ==
In 1945, after the end of the war, Gilbert was sent to Nuremberg, Germany, as an interpreter for the International Military Tribunal for the trials of the high-ranking World War II German prisoners. Upon arrival, Gilbert was appointed to serve as prison psychologist, with the duty of working with a psychiatrist to evaluate and observe but not to treat the detainees. Before and during the trial process Gilbert, along with psychiatrist Douglas Kelley, became the confidant of Hermann Göring, Joachim von Ribbentrop, Wilhelm Keitel, Hans Frank, Oswald Pohl, Otto Ohlendorf, Rudolf Höss, and Ernst Kaltenbrunner, among others. In all, 22 high-ranking Nazi leaders were held for trial. One of them, Robert Ley, committed suicide before the trial could begin. Gilbert and Kelley administered the Rorschach inkblot test to the 21 surviving Nazi leadership captives prior to the first set of trials. Gilbert also participated in the Nuremberg trials as American Military Chief Psychologist and provided testimony attesting to the sanity of Rudolf Hess.

Gilbert also administered IQ tests to the Nazi leadership. Hjalmar Schacht scored highest with 143 points, followed by Arthur Seyss-Inquart and Göring. Julius Streicher scored lowest with 106 points.

In 1946, after the trials, Gilbert returned to the United States, where he engaged in teaching, research and writing. In 1947 he published part of his diary, consisting of observations taken during interviews, interrogations, "eavesdropping" and conversations with the German prisoners, under the title Nuremberg Diary. (This diary was reprinted in full in 1961 just before the trial of Adolf Eichmann in Jerusalem.) Gilbert's work at Nuremberg, especially his tense, rivalrous relationship with Douglas Kelley, is detailed in Jack El-Hai's 2013 book The Nazi and the Psychiatrist, which is also the basis of the 2025 film Nuremberg.

In one interview with Göring, Gilbert discussed how national leaders generate popular support for war:

Göring: Why, of course, the people don't want war. Why would some poor slob on a farm want to risk his life in a war when the best that he can get out of it is to come back to his farm in one piece? Naturally, the common people don't want war; neither in Russia, nor in England, nor in America, nor for that matter in Germany. That is understood. But, after all, it is the leaders of the country who determine the policy and it is always a simple matter to drag the people along, whether it is a democracy, or a fascist dictatorship, or a parliament, or a communist dictatorship.

Gilbert: There is one difference. In a democracy the people have some say in the matter through their elected representatives, and in the United States only Congress can declare wars.

Göring: Oh, that is all well and good, but, voice or no voice, the people can always be brought to the bidding of the leaders. That is easy. All you have to do is tell them they are being attacked, and denounce the pacifists for lack of patriotism and exposing the country to danger. It works the same way in any country.

== Later life ==
In 1948, as Head Psychologist at the Veterans Hospital at Lyons, NJ, Gilbert treated veterans of World Wars I and II who had suffered nervous breakdowns.

In 1950, Gilbert published The Psychology of Dictatorship: Based on an Examination of the Leaders of Nazi Germany. In this book, Gilbert made an attempt to portray a profile of the psychological behavior of Adolf Hitler, based on deductive work from eyewitness reports from Hitler's commanders in prison in Nuremberg.

In 1961, when he was the chairman of the psychology department of Long Island University in Brooklyn, Gilbert was summoned to testify in the trial of Adolf Eichmann in Jerusalem. Gilbert testified on May 29, 1961, describing how both Ernst Kaltenbrunner and Rudolf Höss tried in their conversations with him to put the responsibility for the extermination of the Jews on each other's doorstep. Nevertheless, Eichmann appeared in the accounts of both men. Then he presented a document, handwritten by Höss, that surveys the process of extermination at Auschwitz and different sums of people gassed there – under Höss as commandant and according to an oral report by Eichmann. The court decided not to accept Gilbert's psychological analyses of the prisoners at Nuremberg as part of his testimony.

Gilbert died on 6 February 1977.

== In film and fiction ==
Gustave Gilbert has been portrayed by the following actors in film, television and theater productions:

- Jan Englert in the 1970 Polish film Epilog norymberski
- Vlastimir Đuza Stojiljković in the 1970 Yugoslavian film Nirnberski epilog
- Matt Craven in the 2000 Canadian/US TV production Nuremberg
- August Zirner in the 2005 German docudrama Speer und Er
- Robert Jezek in the 2006 British television production Nuremberg: Goering's Last Stand
- Adam Godley in the 2006 British television docudrama Nuremberg: Nazis on Trial
- Colin Hanks in the 2025 movie Nuremberg

The character "Abe Fields" in Michael Koehlmeier's 2008 book Abendland ("Occident") is based on Gustave Gilbert (see the interview with the author in the Austrian paper Der Falter of 15. 8. 2007). In the book, Abe Fields sits in on the trials as psychologist and speaks to the defendants.

== Selected works ==
- (1947). Nuremberg Diary. Farrar, Straus and Company: New York.
- (1948). "Hermann Göring: Amiable Psychopath". Journal of Abnormal and Social Psychology, 43, 211–229.
- (1950). The Psychology of Dictatorship: Based on an Examination of the Leaders of Nazi Germany. New York: The Ronald Press Company.
- (1951). "Stereotype persistence and change among college students". Journal of Abnormal and Social Psychology, 46, 245–254.

== See also ==
- Leon Goldensohn
