= Joseph Malta =

American executioner (1918–1999)

Joseph Malta (November 27, 1918 – January 6, 1999) was the United States Army hangman who, with Master Sergeant John C. Woods, carried out the Nuremberg executions of ten former top leaders of the Nazi Germany on October 16, 1946, after they were sentenced to death during the Nuremberg trials. Malta was a 28-year-old military policeman when he volunteered for the job. He ultimately hanged a total of 60 Nazi government and military leaders. A floor sander in civilian life, Malta left the Army in 1947 and returned to his former job. "It was a pleasure doing it," noted Malta in 1996, echoing the sentiments of his colleague Woods.
