= Moshe Pearlman =

Israeli writer (1911–1986)

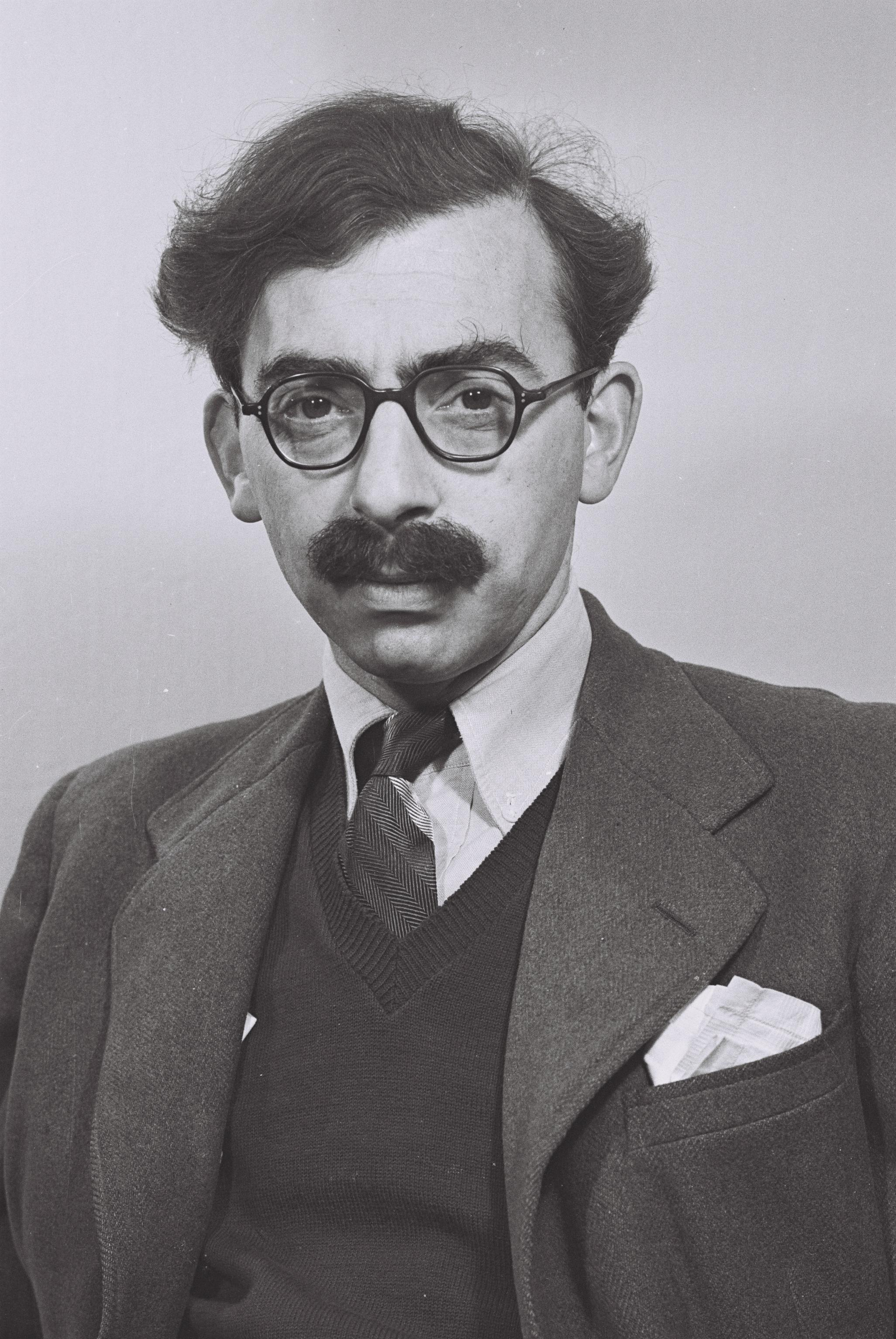
Pearlman in 1952

Moshe Pearlman (Hebrew: משה פרלמן; 1911 – 5 April 1986), born Maurice Pearlman, was an Israeli writer.

== Biography ==
He was born in London, England, and his original name was Morris Perlman. His father was born in Minsk, his mother was born in England by an immigrant family who came from Poland.

He studied at the London School of Economics, and was a student of Harold Laski.

He first worked in the 1930s as a journalist, where he was editor of the Zionist Review. In 1936, he emigrated to Israel, and lived in a kibbutz for a year.

He joined the Army of the newly founded State of Israel. From 1948 to 1952 he was the first Israeli military spokesman.

In 1960 he retired and devoted himself to literary activity.

== Books ==
- What has been happening in Palestine, 1937
- The kvutza: a description of the collective settlement in Palestine (with Shalom Wurm), 1943
- Mufti of Jerusalem: The Story of Haj Amin El Husseini, 1947 (Victor Gollancz Ltd., London)
- Adventure in the Sun: An Informal Account of the Communal Settlements of Palestine, 1947 (Victor Gollancz/Left Book Club, London)
- The army of Israel, 1950
- The Capture Of Adolf Eichmann, 1961
- The capture and trial of Adolf Eichmann, 1963
- Historical sites in Israel, 1965
- The Zealots of Masada, 1967
- Jerusalem; a history of forty centuries (with Teddy Kollek), 1968
- In the footsteps of Moses, 1973
- The Maccabees, 1973
- Digging up the Bible: the stories behind the great archaeological discoveries in the Holy Land, 1980
