= Nuremberg Diary =

1947 interview collection by Gustave Gilbert

- Author: Gustave Gilbert
- Language: English
- Publisher: Farrar, Straus and Giroux
- Publication date: 1947
- Publication place: New York

Nuremberg Diary is Gustave Gilbert's account of interviews he conducted during the Nuremberg trials of high-ranking Nazi leaders, including Hermann Göring, who were involved in World War II and the Holocaust.

Gilbert, a fluent German speaker, served as a prison psychologist in Nuremberg, arriving on 20 October 1945, where he had close contact with those on trial. The text is the verbatim notes Gilbert took immediately after having conversations with the prisoners, information backed up by essays he asked them to write about themselves.

Following the indictments, Gilbert writes: "I asked each of the defendants to autography my copy... with a brief statement giving his opinion of it". Out of the twenty responses received, most either proclaimed personal innocence while blaming Hitler and Himmler, or dismissed the charges entirely. Rosenberg and Streicher blamed the Jews.

== Background and contents ==
In 1945, after the end of the war, Gilbert was sent to Nuremberg, Allied-occupied Germany, as a translator for the International Military Tribunal for the trials of high-ranking German Nazi leaders for war crimes. Gilbert was appointed their prison psychologist. During the process of the trials Gilbert became, after Douglas Kelley, the confidant of Hermann Göring, Joachim von Ribbentrop, Wilhelm Keitel, Hans Frank, Oswald Pohl, Otto Ohlendorf, Rudolf Höss, and Ernst Kaltenbrunner, among others. Gilbert and Kelley administered the Rorschach inkblot test to the 22 defendants in the Nazi leadership group prior to the first set of trials. Gilbert also participated in the Nuremberg trials as the American Military Chief Psychologist and provided testimony attesting to the sanity of Rudolf Hess.

Gilbert also administered IQ tests to the Nazi leadership. Hjalmar Schacht scored highest with 143 points, followed by Arthur Seyss-Inquart and Göring. Julius Streicher scored lowest with 106 points.

In 1946, after the trials, Gilbert returned to the US. Gilbert stayed busy teaching, researching, and writing. In 1947 he published Nuremberg Diary, consisting of observations taken during interviews, interrogations, "eavesdropping" and conversations with German prisoners. An expanded edition was printed in 1961 just before the trial of Adolf Eichmann (one of the major organisers of the Holocaust).

The following is a famous exchange Gilbert had with Göring from this book:

Göring: Why, of course, the people don't want war. Why would some poor slob on a farm want to risk his life in a war when the best that he can get out of it is to come back to his farm in one piece? Naturally, the common people don't want war; neither in Russia, nor in England, nor in America, nor for that matter in Germany. That is understood. But, after all, it is the leaders of the country who determine the policy and it is always a simple matter to drag the people along, whether it is a democracy, or a fascist dictatorship, or a parliament, or a communist dictatorship.

Gilbert: There is one difference. In a democracy the people have some say in the matter through their elected representatives, and in the United States only Congress can declare wars.

Göring: Oh, that is all well and good, but, voice or no voice, the people can always be brought to the bidding of the leaders. That is easy. All you have to do is tell them they are being attacked, and denounce the pacifists for lack of patriotism and exposing the country to danger. It works the same way in any country.

== Publication history ==
Nuremberg Diary was first published in 1947, again in 1948, and an expanded edition was issued in 1961, just before the trial of Adolf Eichmann.

The 1948 London edition contains a foreword by Sir David Maxwell Fyfe, Deputy Chief Prosecutor for the British Legation. This edition does not contain Göring's comment that "the people can always be brought to the bidding of the leaders. That is easy. All you have to do is tell them they are being attacked and denounce the pacifists for lack of patriotism and exposing the country to danger. It works the same way in any country."
