= Nuremberg executions =

Executions that followed the Nuremberg Trials

On the early morning of October 16, 1946, shortly after the conclusion of the Nuremberg trials, ten prominent members of the political and military leadership of Nazi Germany were executed by hanging: Joachim von Ribbentrop, Wilhelm Keitel, Ernst Kaltenbrunner, Alfred Rosenberg, Hans Frank, Wilhelm Frick, Julius Streicher, Fritz Sauckel, Alfred Jodl and Arthur Seyss-Inquart. Hermann Göring was also scheduled to be executed on that day, but had committed suicide using a potassium cyanide capsule the night before. Martin Bormann was also sentenced to death in absentia; at the time, his whereabouts were unknown, but it has since been confirmed that he died while attempting to escape Berlin on May 2, 1945.

For their last meal, the condemned men were served sausage and cold cuts, along with potato salad and black bread, and were given tea to drink. Starting at approximately 1:10 am, they were led one at a time to the execution chamber to be hanged. The death sentences were carried out in the gymnasium of Nuremberg Prison by the United States Army using the standard drop method (instead of the long drop method favored by British executioners). Three temporary gallows had been erected in the gymnasium, with the execution team using two in alternating order and reserving the remaining gallows as a spare.

The executioners were Master Sergeant John C. Woods and his assistant, military policeman Joseph Malta. Woods's use of standard drops for the executions meant that some of the men did not die quickly of an intended broken neck but instead strangled slowly. Some reports indicated some executions took from 14 to 28 minutes. The Army denied claims that the drop length was too short or that the condemned died from strangulation instead of a broken neck. Additionally, the trapdoor was so small that several of the condemned, including Keitel and Frick, suffered bleeding head injuries when they hit the sides of the trapdoor while dropping through. The bodies were rumored to have been taken to Dachau for cremation but were instead cremated in Ostfriedhof, Munich and their ashes scattered over the river Isar.

Joseph Kingsbury-Smith of the International News Service wrote an eyewitness account of the hangings. His account, accompanied by photos, appeared in newspapers.

== Order of executions ==
Scheduled order of executions
Order	Name	Final statement (Last words)	Time of death
1	Hermann Göring (Note: Committed suicide the night before his scheduled execution.)	N/A	N/A
2	Joachim von Ribbentrop	"God protect Germany. God have mercy on my soul. My final wish is that Germany should recover her unity and that, for the sake of peace, there should be an understanding between East and West. I wish peace to the world." Nuremberg Prison Commandant Burton C. Andrus later recalled that Ribbentrop turned to the prison's Lutheran chaplain, Henry F. Gerecke, immediately before the hood was placed over his head and whispered, "I'll see you again."	01:30 a.m.
3	Wilhelm Keitel	"I call on God Almighty to have mercy on the German people. More than two million German soldiers went to their death for the fatherland before me. I follow now my sons—all for Germany."	01:44 a.m.
4	Ernst Kaltenbrunner	"I have loved my German people and my fatherland with a warm heart. I have done my duty by the laws of my people and I am sorry my people were led this time by men who were not soldiers and that crimes were committed of which I had no knowledge. Germany, good luck."	01:52 a.m.
5	Alfred Rosenberg	(Upon being asked whether he had anything to say.) "No."	01:59 a.m.
6	Hans Frank	"I am thankful for the kind treatment during my captivity and I ask God to accept me with mercy."	02:08 a.m.
7	Wilhelm Frick	"Long live eternal Germany."	02:20 a.m.
8	Julius Streicher	"Adele, my dear wife."	Unknown
9	Fritz Sauckel	"I am dying innocent. The sentence is wrong. God protect Germany and make Germany great again. Long live Germany! God protect my family."	02:40 a.m.
10	Alfred Jodl	"My greetings to you, my Germany."	02:50 a.m.
11	Arthur Seyss-Inquart	"I hope that this execution marks the final act of the tragedy of the Second World War and that the lesson learned from this war will be that peace and understanding should exist between peoples. I believe in Germany."	02:59 a.m.

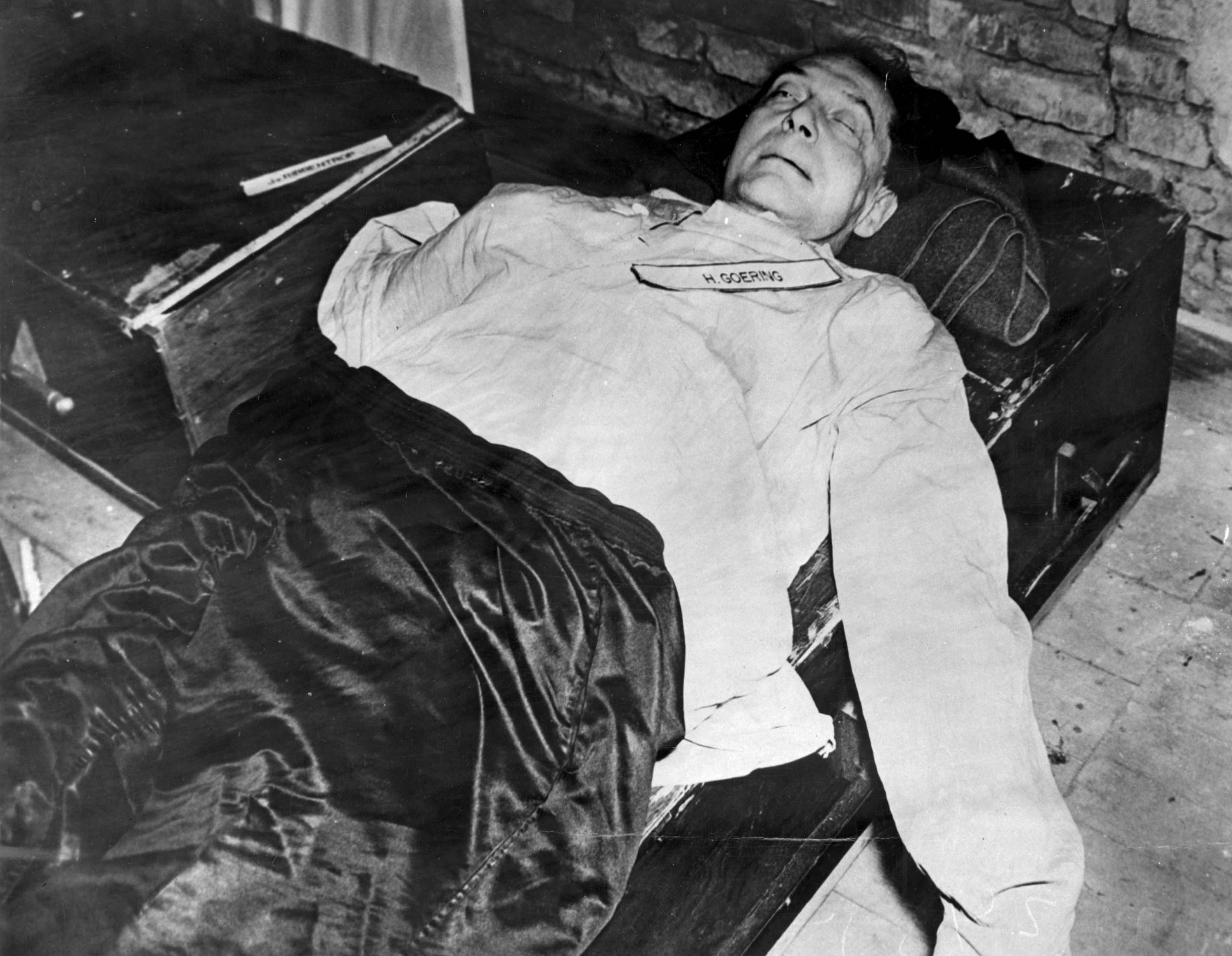
The body of Hermann Göring who had committed suicide pre-empting execution

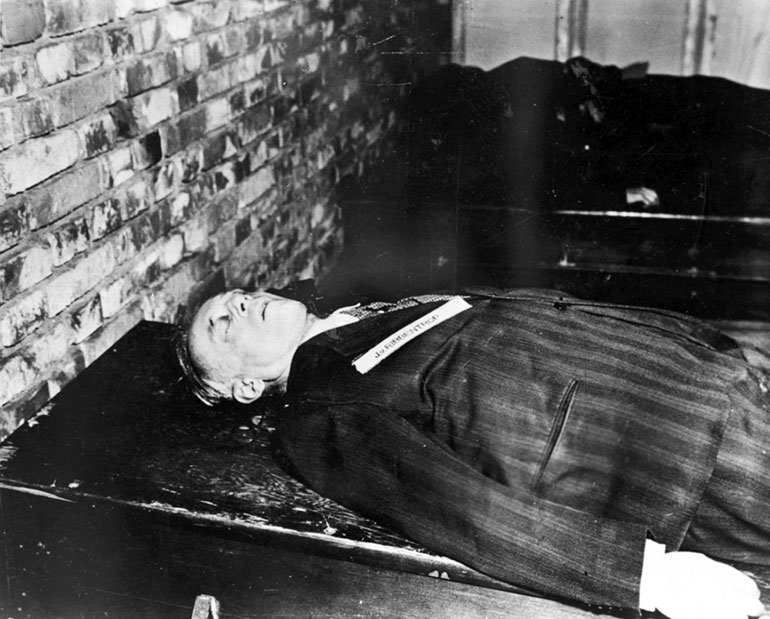
The body of Joachim von Ribbentrop

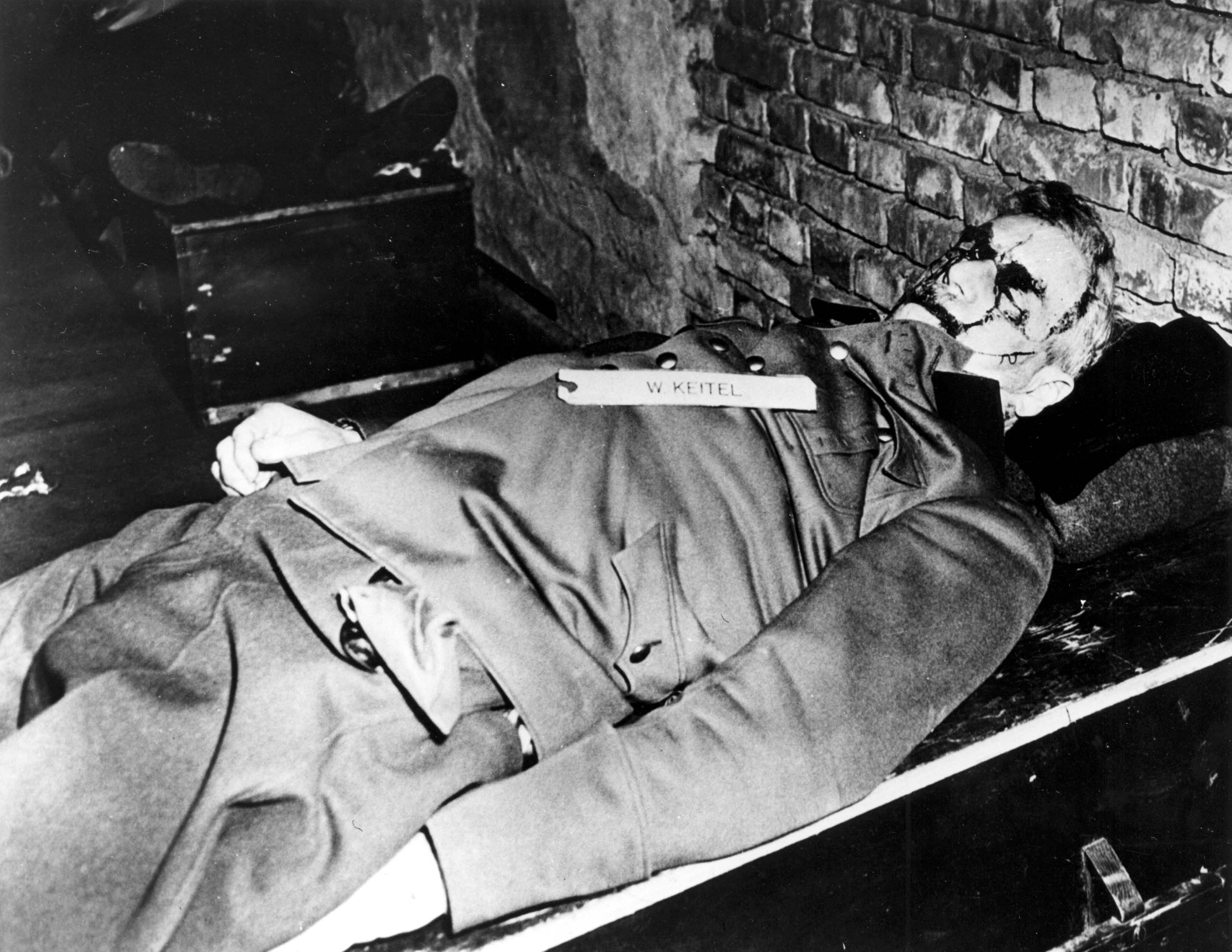
The body of Wilhelm Keitel, showing injuries as he hit his head on the trapdoor.

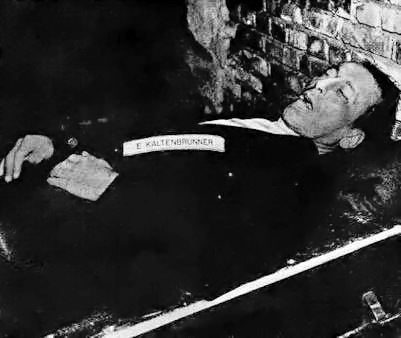
The body of Ernst Kaltenbrunner

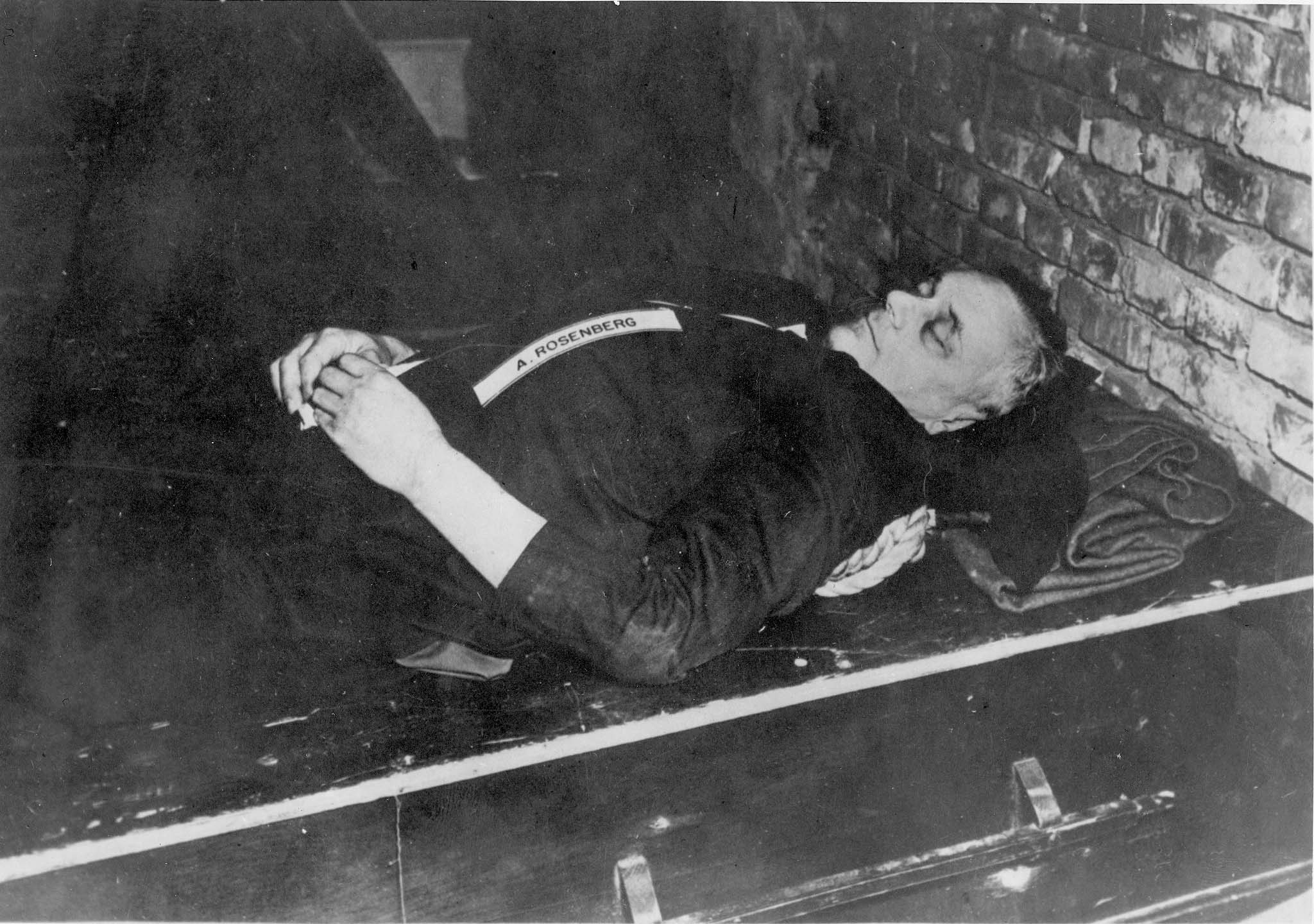
The body of Alfred Rosenberg

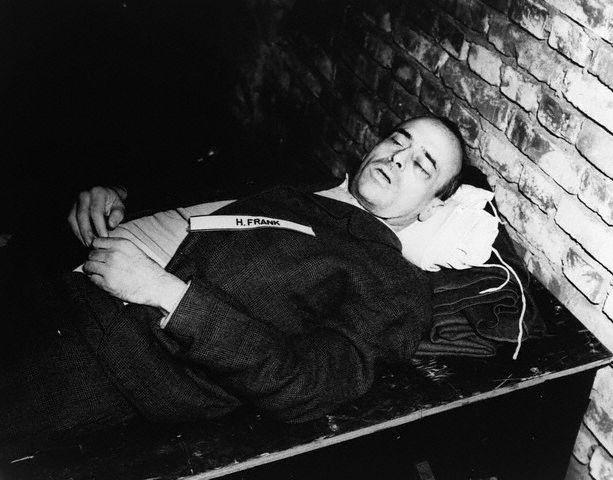
The body of Hans Frank

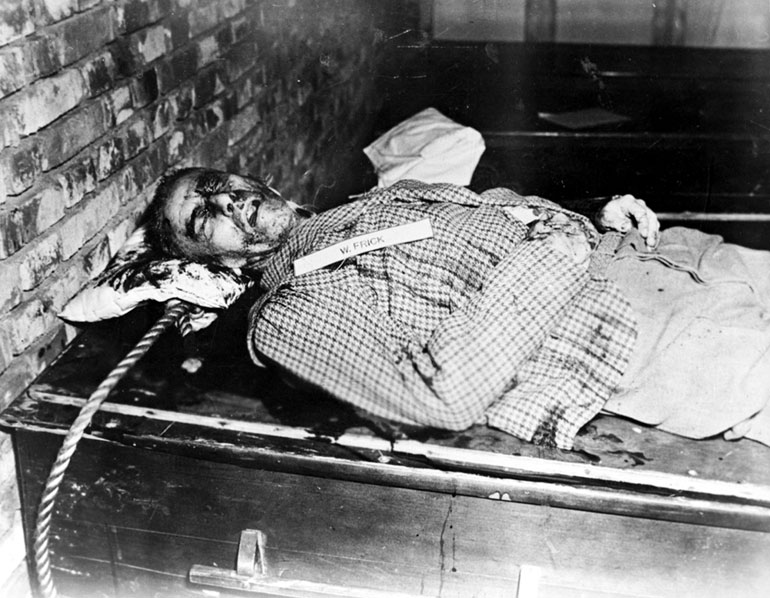
The body of Wilhelm Frick, showing injuries as he hit his head on the trapdoor.

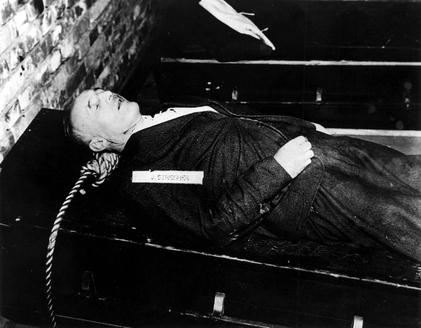
The body of Julius Streicher

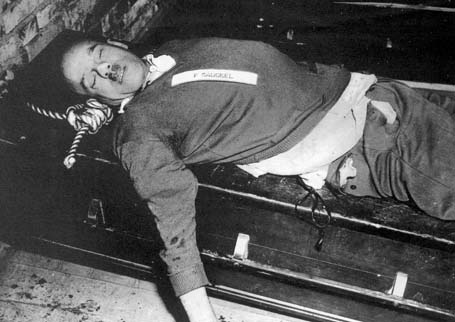
The body of Fritz Sauckel

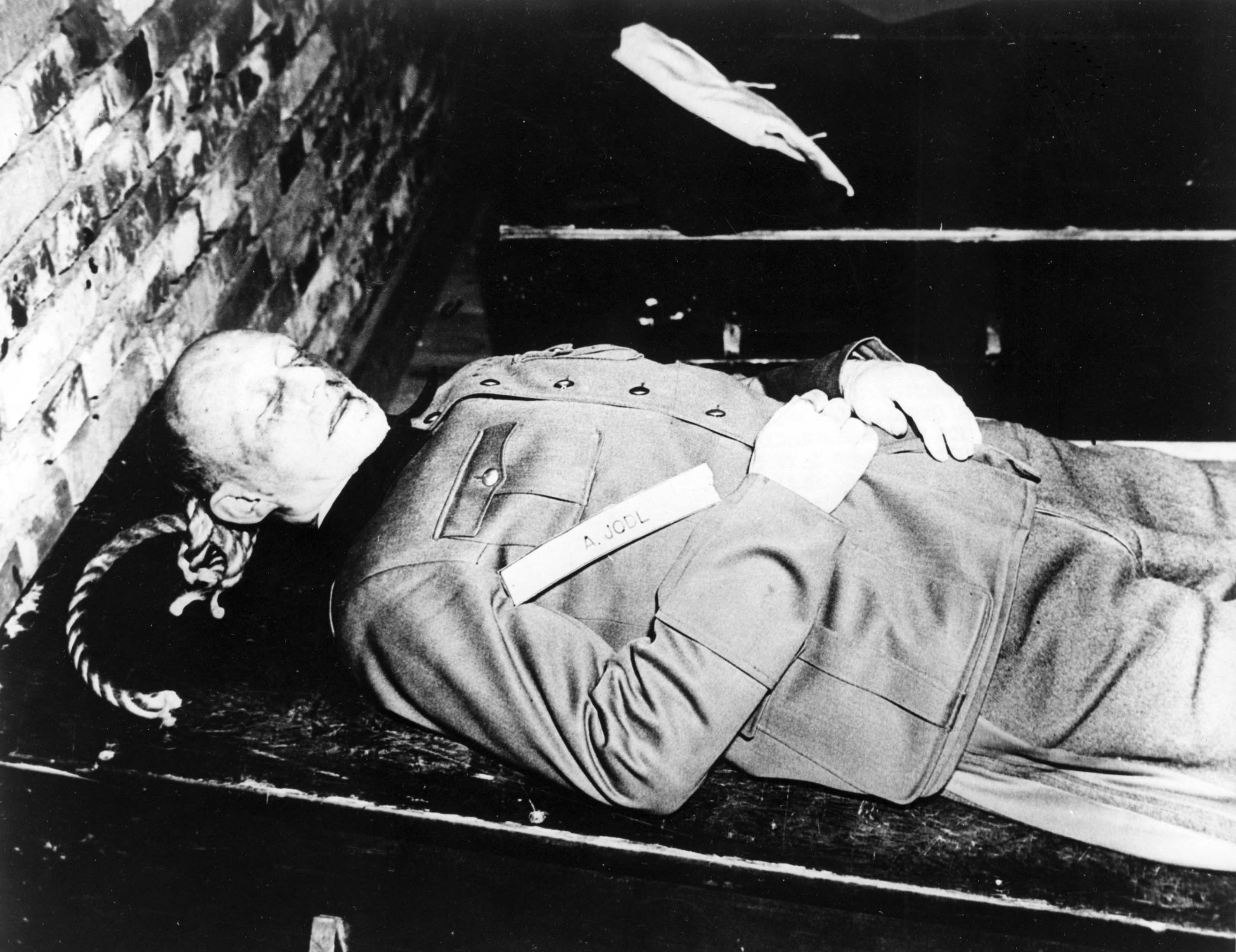
The body of Alfred Jodl

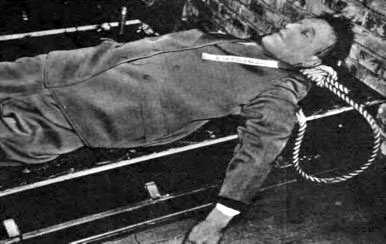
The body of Arthur Seyss-Inquart

== Sources ==
- Bloch, Michael (1992). Ribbentrop. London: Bantam Press. ISBN 0-593-01896-6.
