= Leon Goldensohn =

American psychiatrist (1911–1961)

- Born: Leon Nathaniel Goldensohn; October 19, 1911; New York City
- Died: October 24, 1961 (aged 50); New York City
- Occupation: Psychiatrist

Leon Nathaniel Goldensohn (October 19, 1911 – October 24, 1961) was an American psychiatrist who monitored the mental health of the twenty-one Nazi defendants during the trial at Nuremberg in 1946.

== Early Life, Service at Nuremberg ==
Born on October 19, 1911, in New York City, Goldensohn was the son of Jewish emigrés from Lithuania. He obtained his psychoanalytic training at the William Alanson White Institute, and then joined the United States Army in 1943. Goldensohn was posted to France and Germany, where he served as a psychiatrist for the 63rd Division.

At Nuremberg, Goldensohn replaced another psychiatrist, Douglas Kelley, in January 1946, about six weeks into the trials, and spent more than six months visiting the prisoners nearly every day. He interviewed most of the defendants, including Hermann Göring and Joachim von Ribbentrop, the Foreign Minister of Germany from 1938 until 1945. Goldensohn conducted most of his interviews in English with the aid of an interpreter to have the defendants and witnesses express themselves fully in their own language, with the objective of evaluating and observing but not of treating them. Some of his subjects, notably von Ribbentrop, who had been ambassador to the United Kingdom, and Großadmiral Karl Dönitz, were partially or fully fluent in English, and conducted their interviews in that language. Goldensohn served as prison psychiatrist until July 26, 1946.

== Post-War, Family and Death ==
After the war, Goldensohn kept his papers at his New York City office-apartment and his home in Tenafly, New Jersey. He and his wife, Irene ("Renee") had three children, Max, Daniel, and Julia.

Goldensohn had resolved to write a book about his experiences at Nuremberg but later contracted tuberculosis and died from a coronary heart attack in 1961 before accomplishing the book project. The detailed notes he took were later researched and collated by his brother Eli (1916–2013), a retired neurologist. Robert Gellately, a World War II scholar, edited and annotated the interviews in the 2004 book The Nuremberg Interviews: An American Psychiatrist's Conversations with the Defendants and Witnesses.
