= Michael Wadding (television) =

Michael Wadding is a British television writer, director and producer. He began his career at the BBC with the 1999 Doctor Who documentaries Carnival of Monsters and Adventures in Space and Time. Wadding co-wrote and co-directed the 2006 series Nuremberg: Nazis on Trial.

== Filmography ==
- 1999 Carnival of Monsters & Adventures in Space and Time producer & director
- 1999 Great Railway Journeys: Los Mochis to Veracruz producer & director
- 2001 The Real Shirley Bassey producer & director
- 2002 Staying Up producer
- 2003 Magic at War producer & director
- 2006 Nuremberg: Nazis on Trial director & writer
- 2008 Timewatch: Young Victoria producer & director
- 2009 Who Do You Think You Are?: Kate Humble director
- 2010–, Episodes Chaim Rumkowski, The Croatian Collaborator, The Grand Mufti, The Greek Collaborator, of TV mini-series Nazi Collaborators director
