= Jack El-Hai =

American journalist and author

- Born: Jack El-Hai; Los Angeles, California, United States
- Occupation: Writer
- Notable work: The Nazi and the Psychiatrist: Herman Göring, Dr. Douglas M. Kelley, and a Fatal Meeting of Minds at the End of WWII
- Website: www.el-hai.com

Jack El-Hai is an American journalist, author, and teacher who focuses most of his work on the history of medicine, the history of science, and other historical topics. His 2013 New York Times best selling book The Nazi and the Psychiatrist was the basis for the 2025 major motion picture Nuremberg.

== Career ==
El-Hai graduated from Carleton College in 1979. He was the president of the American Society of Journalists and Authors. He has been a contributor to the Atlantic Monthly, the Washington Post Magazine, American Heritage, and other publications. El-Hai has also taught courses on nonfiction writing at the School of Journalism and Mass Communication and the Creative Writing Program of the University of Minnesota, the Split Rock Arts Program, the Mayo Clinic, and the Loft Literary Center. He has also taught courses in the Master of Fine Arts creative writing program at Augsburg University in Minneapolis.

== Works ==
He is the author of a biography of Dr. Walter Freeman, The Lobotomist: A Maverick Medical Genius and His Tragic Quest to Rid the World of Mental Illness (2005, Wiley), The Nazi and the Psychiatrist (2013), and Turbulent Air: A History of Northwest Airlines (2013). In 2026 he published a true-crime narrative entitled The Case of the Autographed Corpse: A Medicine Man and a Mystery Writer in Pursuit of Justice.

His shorter works have appeared in The Atlantic, Wired, Scientific American Mind, The History Channel Magazine, and many other publications.

The 2025 film Nuremberg was a major motion picture based on El-Hai’s book The Nazi and the Psychiatrist. It followed other films and television productions about the Nuremberg trials of Nazi leaders in 1945, most notably Stanley Kramer’s Oscar-winning classic Judgment at Nuremberg (1961). Film director James Vanderbilt acknowledged that he "found his angle” for his rendition of the historical event in El-Hai’s account of the interaction between American psychiatrist Douglas Kelley and Hermann Göring. Kelley was "the young army psychiatrist tasked with determining the mental competence of the accused Germans slated to stand trial at Nuremberg”; Göring was the most senior Nazi put on trial in Nuremberg.

== Awards and honors ==
His awards include the June Roth Memorial Award for Medical Journalism (2002), two Minnesota Book Awards (2005 for The Lobotomist and 2014 for The Nazi and the Psychiatrist), a McKnight Fellowship, and Outstanding Article honors from the American Society of Journalists and Authors.

== Personal ==
El-Hai lives in Minneapolis with his wife and two daughters.
