= Douglas Kelley =

American psychiatrist (1912–1958)

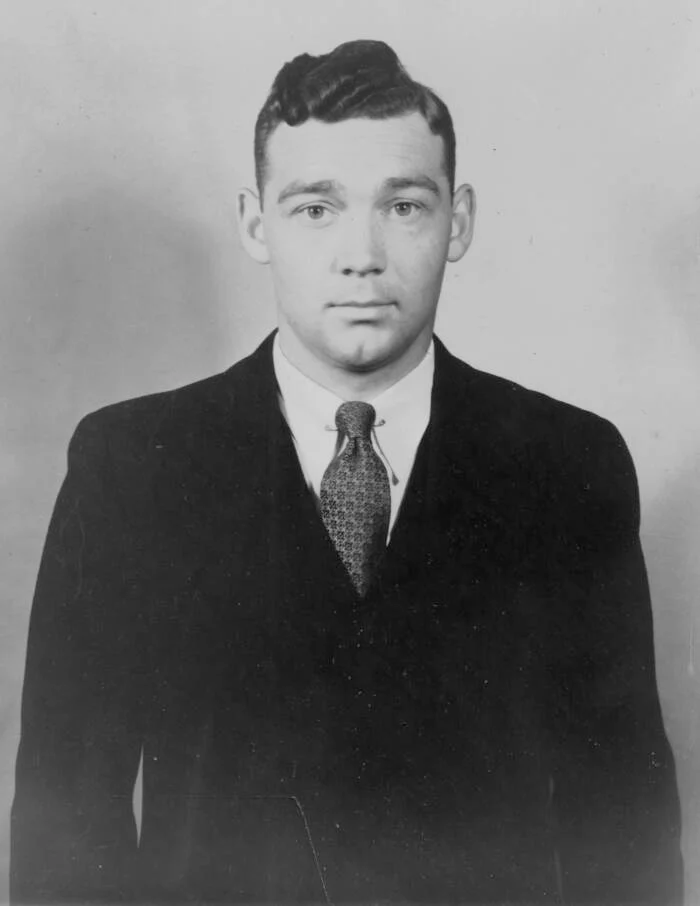
- Kelley around 1938, as a Columbia University graduate student
- Born: Douglas McGlashan Kelley; August 11, 1912; Truckee, California, U.S.
- Died: January 1, 1958 (aged 45); Berkeley, California, U.S.
- Cause of death: Suicide by cyanide poisoning
- Spouse: Alice Vivienne Hill (m. 1940)
- Children: 3

Academic background
- Education: University of California, San Francisco; University of California, Berkeley; Columbia University
- Thesis: Rorschach studies in acute experimental alcoholic intoxication (1941)

Academic work
- Discipline: Psychiatry, criminology
- Institutions: University of California, Berkeley
- Notable works: 22 Cells in Nuremberg (1947)
- Military career
- Branch: United States Army Medical Corps
- Rank: Lieutenant colonel

Lieutenant Colonel Douglas McGlashan Kelley (11 August 1912 – 1 January 1958) was a United States Army Military Intelligence Corps officer who served as chief psychiatrist at Nuremberg Prison during the first months of the Nuremberg trials. He worked to ascertain defendants' competency before they stood trial.

== Early life ==
Douglas McGlashan Kelley was born in Truckee, California, son of George and June Kelley, and grew up in San Francisco. His father was a dentist. He received his degree in medicine and psychology from University of California, San Francisco and University of California, Berkeley in 1936. Kelley later earned a second doctorate in medical science from the College of Physicians and Surgeons at Columbia University on a Rockefeller fellowship in 1941.

== Personal life ==
On 16 Oct 1940 Douglas registered for the WWII draft, with his California address. Three days later, he married Alice Vivienne Hill on 19 Oct. 1940, in Hamilton County, TN. They had three children; Doug, Alicia, and Allen.

== Career ==
Kelley was the director of the San Francisco City and County Psychopathic Hospital prior to joining the army. He was an accomplished amateur magician, and in the mid-1930s was an officer in the prestigious Society of American Magicians. When working in the Bay Area he drew attention by teaching patients magic tricks as occupational therapy, something that was perhaps unique in American psychiatry. In a journal article in 1940 he argued that teaching patients how to do magic tricks was more effective in rehabilitating psychiatric patients than many other forms of therapy.

=== World War II ===
Kelley had been in Europe treating American World War II soldiers for combat stress. In August 1945, as he was serving as a United States Army major, Kelley was assigned as the chief psychiatrist for the Nazi leadership following the end of the war. For the five months leading up to the Nuremberg Trials, Kelley examined 22 high ranking officials of the Nazi party, including Adolf Hitler's second-in-command Hermann Göring and Hitler's deputy Rudolf Hess. Kelley worked with psychologist Gustave Gilbert to administer Rorschach tests as part of their work. Kelley was tasked with determining whether or not the individuals were insane and predict if they would have a breakdown during the imminent trials. During his time there, he spent approximately 80–90 hours with the prisoners. He determined that only Robert Ley was insane. In addition to the ink blot tests, Kelley administered I.Q. tests and had them write an autobiographical sketch. The objective was to observe and evaluate but not to treat the prisoners.

Following his assessment of Nazi leadership, Kelley concluded that the defendants did not represent a specifically Nazi pathology, but that "they were simply creatures of their environment, as all humans are" and in some circumstances, many people would act similarly. When he left, Kelley took his work to his home in Santa Barbara, California, including notes, tests, X-rays of Hitler's skull, Göring's confiscated paracodeine capsules, and Hess' food packets and statement. He was succeeded at Nuremberg as U.S. Army psychiatric interviewer by Leon Goldensohn. Kelley authored a book on his findings titled 22 Cells in Nuremberg.

=== Post war ===
In 1946, Kelley published a book on the Rorschach test. He later directed the Graylyn Psychopathic Hospital at the Bowman Gray School of Medicine in North Carolina. A year after this, Kelley became the head of the Department of Psychology at Berkeley. During this time, he was a consultant for the Berkeley police, San Quentin Prison, the United States Army, and the United States Air Force.

During his post-war career, Kelley investigated the psychological motives of criminals, as well as evaluating the psychological fitness of law enforcement officers. In the 1950s he was an advocate for increased psychological screening of prospective police officers, something that was not regularly done at the time. His work also involved experimenting with truth serums, including developing sodium thiopental and sodium amytal injections and nitrous oxide and ether inhalants, many of which he had tried on himself.

He also used polygraph tests on criminal subjects. Kelley's work helped lead to the conviction of Burton Abbott. At the time of his death, he was a professor of psychiatry and criminology at UC Berkeley.

Kelley was described by family as an alcoholic who had outbursts of anger and had a history of threatening suicide. On New Year's Day 1958, Kelley had an outburst while cooking, having burned himself, and told his family he was going to commit suicide. Witnessed by his wife, father and three children, he ingested a capsule of potassium cyanide, the same method of suicide as Nazi leader Göring. News reports at the time said police determined the capsule was the same as the ones Kelley took from Nuremberg. His family, however, have disputed this. His physicians reported that prior to his death, Kelley was being treated for a stomach condition and under high amounts of stress.

== Cultural depictions ==
Kelley is portrayed by Stuart Bunce in the 2006 BBC docudrama Nuremberg: Nazis on Trial, which depicts the events at Nuremberg, and by Rami Malek as the protagonist in the 2025 film Nuremberg, which is based on Jack El-Hai's 2013 nonfiction book The Nazi And The Psychiatrist: Herman Goring, Dr. Douglas M. Kelley, and a Fatal Meeting of Minds at the End of WWII.

== Publications ==
- 22 Cells in Nuremberg. A Psychiatrist Examines the Nazi Criminals. London: W. H. Allen, 1947.
- Bruno Klopfer: The Rorschach Technique. A Manual for a Projective Method of Personality Diagnosis. With Clinical Contributions by Douglas McGlashan Kelley; introduction by Nolan D. C. Lewis. Yonkers-on-Hudson: World Book Comp. 1942.

== Sources ==
- El-Hai, Jack (2013). The Nazi and the Psychiatrist: Hermann Göring, Dr. Douglas M. Kelley, and a fatal meeting of minds at the end of WWII. New York: PublicAffairs.
