= Sprachen & Dolmetscher Institut München =

Coordinates: 48.0966°N 11.5320°E

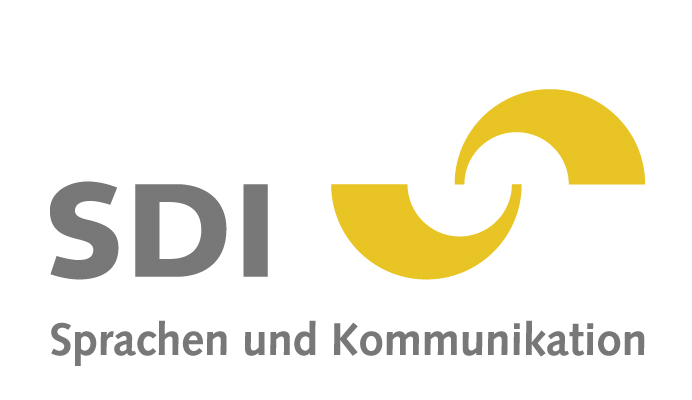
Sprachen & Dolmetscher Institut München

Sprachen & Dolmetscher Institut München (Languages and translators institute) is located in Maxvorstadt, Munich, Bavaria, Germany.

== History ==
The Sprachen & Dolmetscher Institut München was founded in 1952 in Munich by Paul Otto Schmidt (1899–1970), the former personal translator of Adolf Hitler
