= Joachim von Ribbentrop =

German politician and diplomat (1893–1946)

- Ribbentrop in 1938

Reich Minister of Foreign Affairs
- In office 4 February 1938 – 30 April 1945
- Chancellor: Adolf Hitler
- Preceded by: Konstantin von Neurath
- Succeeded by: Arthur Seyss-Inquart

Ambassador of Germany to the United Kingdom
- In office 30 October 1936 – 4 February 1938
- Appointed by: Adolf Hitler
- Preceded by: Leopold von Hoesch
- Succeeded by: Herbert von Dirksen

Additional positions
- 1933–1945: Member of the Greater German Reichstag

Personal details
- Born: Ulrich Friedrich-Wilhelm Joachim Ribbentrop; 30 April 1893 Wesel, Germany
- Died: 16 October 1946 (aged 53) Nuremberg, Germany
- Cause of death: Execution by hanging
- Party: Nazi Party (1932–1945)
- Spouse: Anna Elisabeth Henkell (m. 1920)
- Children: 5, including Rudolf
- Profession: Businessman; diplomat

Military service
- Allegiance: German Empire
- Branch/service: Imperial German Army
- Years of service: 1914–1918
- Unit: 12th (Thuringian) Hussars
- Battles/wars: World War I
- Criminal information
- Status: Executed
- Convictions: Conspiracy to commit crimes against peace; Crimes of aggression; War crimes; Crimes against humanity
- Trial: Nuremberg trials
- Penalty: Death

Ulrich Friedrich-Wilhelm Joachim von Ribbentrop (German: [joˈʔaxɪm fɔn ˈʁɪbəntʁɔp]; 30 April 1893 – 16 October 1946) was a German politician, diplomat, and war criminal who served as Minister of Foreign Affairs of Nazi Germany from 1938 to 1945.

Ribbentrop first came to Adolf Hitler's notice as a well-travelled businessman with more knowledge of the outside world than most senior Nazis and as a perceived authority on foreign affairs. He offered his house Schloss Fuschl for the secret meetings in January 1933 that resulted in Hitler's appointment as Chancellor of Germany. He became a close confidant of Hitler, to the dismay of some party members, who thought him unintelligent, superficial and lacking in talent. He was appointed ambassador to the Court of St James's, the royal court of the United Kingdom, in 1936 and then Foreign Minister of Germany in February 1938.

Before World War II, he played a key role in brokering the Pact of Steel (an alliance with Fascist Italy) and the Molotov–Ribbentrop Pact (the German–Soviet non-aggression pact). He favoured retaining good relations with the Soviet Union, opposing the invasion of the Soviet Union. In late 1941, due to American aid to Britain and the increasingly frequent "incidents" in the North Atlantic between U-boats and American warships guarding convoys to Britain, Ribbentrop worked for the failure of the Japanese-American talks in Washington and for Japan to attack the United States. He did his utmost to support a declaration of war on the United States after the attack on Pearl Harbor. From 1941 onwards, Ribbentrop's influence declined.

Arrested in June 1945, Ribbentrop was convicted and sentenced to death at the Nuremberg trials for his role in starting World War II in Europe and enabling the Holocaust. On 16 October 1946, he became the first of the Nuremberg defendants to be executed by hanging.

== Early life ==
Joachim von Ribbentrop was born in Wesel, Rhine Province of the Kingdom of Prussia, to Richard Ulrich Friedrich Joachim Ribbentrop, a career army officer, and his wife, Johanne Sophie Hertwig. He was not born with the nobiliary particle von. From 1904 to 1908, Ribbentrop took French courses at Lycée Fabert in Metz, the German Empire's most powerful fortress, and became fluent in both French and English. A former teacher recalled Ribbentrop "was the most stupid in his class, full of vanity and very pushy". His father was cashiered from the Prussian Army in 1908 for repeatedly disparaging Kaiser Wilhelm II for his dismissal of Otto von Bismarck and the Kaiser's alleged homosexuality. As a result, the Ribbentrop family was often short of money.

For the next 18 months, the family moved to Arosa, Switzerland, where the children continued to be taught by French and English private tutors, and Ribbentrop spent his free time skiing and mountaineering. Following the stay in Arosa, Ribbentrop was sent to Britain for a year to improve his knowledge of English. Fluent in both French and English, young Ribbentrop lived at various times in Grenoble, France and London, before travelling to Canada in 1910.

He worked for the Molsons Bank on Stanley Street in Montreal, and then for the engineering firm M. P. and J. T. Davis on the Quebec Bridge reconstruction. He was also employed by the National Transcontinental Railway, which constructed a line from Moncton to Winnipeg. He worked as a journalist in New York City and Boston but returned to Germany to recover from tuberculosis. He returned to Canada and set up a small business in Ottawa importing champagne and German wine. In 1914, he competed for Ottawa's Minto figure-skating team and participated in the Ellis Memorial Trophy tournament in Boston in February.

When the First World War began later in 1914, Ribbentrop left Canada, which, as part of the British Empire, was at war with Germany, and found temporary sanctuary in the neutral United States. On 15 August 1914, he sailed from Hoboken, New Jersey on the Holland-America ship Potsdam, bound for Rotterdam, and on his return to Germany enlisted in the 12th Hussar regiment.

Ribbentrop served first on the Eastern Front, and was then transferred to the Western Front. He earned a commission and was awarded the Iron Cross, having been wounded during his service. In 1918, 1st Lieutenant Ribbentrop was stationed in Istanbul as a staff officer. During his time in Turkey, he became a friend of another staff officer, Franz von Papen.

In 1919, Ribbentrop met Anna Elisabeth Henkell, the daughter of a wealthy Wiesbaden wine producer. They married on 5 July 1920, and Ribbentrop began to travel throughout Europe as a wine salesman. They had five children. In 1925, his "aunt" (Note: "Gertrud von Ribbentrop, although a distant relative, had been a close family friend and had lived with them for long periods during Ribbentrop's youth in Metz.") Gertrud von Ribbentrop adopted him, which allowed him to add the nobiliary particle von to his name.

== Early career ==
In 1928, Ribbentrop was introduced to Adolf Hitler as a businessman with foreign connections who "gets the same price for German champagne as others get for French champagne". Wolf-Heinrich Graf von Helldorff, with whom Ribbentrop had served in the 12th Torgau Hussars in the First World War, arranged the introduction. Ribbentrop and his wife joined the Nazi Party on 1 May 1932. Ribbentrop began his political career by offering to be a secret emissary between Chancellor of Germany Franz von Papen, his old wartime friend, and Hitler. His offer was initially refused. Six months later, however, Hitler and Papen accepted his help.

Their change of heart occurred after General Kurt von Schleicher ousted Papen in December 1932. This led to a complex set of intrigues in which Papen and various friends of president Paul von Hindenburg negotiated with Hitler to oust Schleicher. On 22 January 1933, State Secretary Otto Meissner and Hindenburg's son Oskar met Hitler, Hermann Göring, and Wilhelm Frick at Ribbentrop's home in Berlin's exclusive Dahlem district. Over dinner, Papen made the fateful concession that if Schleicher's government were to fall, he would abandon his demand for the Chancellorship and instead use his influence with President Hindenburg to ensure Hitler got the Chancellorship.

Ribbentrop was not popular with the Nazi Party's Alte Kämpfer (Old Fighters); they nearly all disliked him. British historian Laurence Rees described Ribbentrop as "the Nazi almost all the other leading Nazis hated". Joseph Goebbels expressed a common view when he confided to his diary that "Von Ribbentrop bought his name, he married his money and he swindled his way into office".

During most of the Weimar Republic era, Ribbentrop was apolitical and displayed no antisemitic prejudices. A visitor to a party Ribbentrop threw in 1928 recorded that Ribbentrop had no political views beyond a vague admiration for Gustav Stresemann, fear of Communism, and a wish to restore the monarchy. Several Berlin Jewish businessmen who did business with Ribbentrop in the 1920s and knew him well later expressed astonishment at the vicious antisemitism he later displayed in the Nazi era, saying that they did not see any indications he had held such views. Ten months after the Nazi seizure of power, Ribbentrop secured a seat as a deputy to the Reichstag from electoral constituency 4 (Potsdam I) at the November 1933 parliamentary election. He was reelected in 1936 and 1938, holding this seat until the fall of the Nazi regime.

== Early diplomatic career ==
=== Background ===
Ribbentrop became Hitler's favourite foreign-policy adviser, partly by dint of his familiarity with the world outside Germany but also by flattery and sycophancy. One German diplomat later recalled, "Ribbentrop didn't understand anything about foreign policy. His sole wish was to please Hitler". In particular, Ribbentrop acquired the habit of listening carefully to what Hitler was saying, memorizing his pet ideas and then later presenting Hitler's ideas as his own, a practice that much impressed Hitler as proving Ribbentrop was an ideal Nazi diplomat. Ribbentrop quickly learned that Hitler always favoured the most radical solution to any problem and accordingly tendered his advice in that direction as a Ribbentrop aide recalled:

When Hitler said "Grey", Ribbentrop said "Black, black, black". He always said it three times more, and he was always more radical. I listened to what Hitler said one day when Ribbentrop wasn't present: "With Ribbentrop it is so easy, he is always so radical. Meanwhile, all the other people I have, they come here, they have problems, they are afraid, they think we should take care and then I have to blow them up, to get strong. And Ribbentrop was blowing up the whole day and I had to do nothing. I had to break – much better!"

Another reason for Ribbentrop's rise was Hitler's distrust of and disdain for Germany's professional diplomats. He suspected that they did not entirely support his new government. However, the Foreign Office diplomats loyally served the government and rarely gave Hitler grounds for criticism, while the Foreign Office diplomats were ultranationalist, authoritarian and antisemitic. As a result, there was enough overlap in values between both groups to allow most of them to work comfortably for the Nazis. Nonetheless, Hitler never quite trusted the Foreign Office and was on the lookout for someone to carry out his foreign policy goals.

=== Undermining Versailles ===
The Nazis and Germany's professional diplomats shared a goal in destroying the Treaty of Versailles and restoring Germany as a great power. In October 1933, German Foreign Minister Baron Konstantin von Neurath presented a note at the World Disarmament Conference announcing that it was unfair that Germany should remain disarmed by Part V of the Versailles Treaty and demanded for the other powers to disarm to Germany's level or to rescind Part V and allow Germany Gleichberechtigung ("equality of armaments"). When France rejected Neurath's note, Germany stormed out of the League of Nations and the World Disarmament Conference. It all but announced its intention of unilaterally violating Part V. Consequently, there were several calls in France for a preventive war to put an end to the Nazi regime while Germany was still more-or-less disarmed.

However, in November, Ribbentrop arranged a meeting between Hitler and the French journalist Fernand de Brinon, who wrote for the newspaper Le Matin. During the meeting, Hitler stressed what he claimed to be his love of peace and his friendship towards France. Hitler's meeting with Brinon had a huge effect on French public opinion and helped to put an end to the calls for a preventive war. It convinced many in France that Hitler was a man of peace, who wanted to do away only with Part V of the Versailles Treaty.

=== Special Commissioner for Disarmament ===
In 1934, Hitler named Ribbentrop Special Commissioner for Disarmament. In his early years, Hitler's goal in foreign affairs was to persuade the world that he wished to reduce the defence budget by making idealistic but very vague disarmament offers (in the 1930s, disarmament described arms limitation agreements). At the same time, the Germans always resisted making concrete arms-limitations proposals, and they went ahead with increased military spending on grounds that other powers would not take up German arms-limitation offers. Ribbentrop was tasked with ensuring that the world remained convinced that Germany sincerely wanted an arms-limitation treaty, but he ensured that no such treaty was ever developed.

On 17 April 1934, French Foreign Minister Louis Barthou issued the so-called "Barthou note", which led to concerns on the part of Hitler that the French would ask for sanctions against Germany for violating Part V of the Versailles Treaty. Ribbentrop volunteered to stop the rumoured sanctions and visited London and Rome. During his visits, Ribbentrop met with British Foreign Secretary, Sir John Simon, and Italian dictator Benito Mussolini and asked them to postpone the next meeting of the Bureau of Disarmament in exchange for which Ribbentrop offered nothing in return other than promising better relations with Berlin. The meeting of the Bureau of Disarmament went ahead as scheduled, but because no sanctions were sought against Germany, Ribbentrop could claim a success.

==== Dienststelle Ribbentrop ====
In August 1934, Ribbentrop founded an organization linked to the Nazi Party called the Büro Ribbentrop (later renamed the Dienststelle Ribbentrop). It functioned as an alternative foreign ministry. The Dienststelle Ribbentrop, which had its offices directly across from the Foreign Office's building on the Wilhelmstrasse in Berlin, had in its membership a collection of Hitlerjugend alumni, dissatisfied businessmen, former reporters, and ambitious Nazi Party members, all of whom tried to conduct a foreign policy independent of and often contrary to the official Foreign Office. The Dienststelle served as an informal tool for the implementation of the foreign policy of Hitler, consciously bypassing the traditional foreign policy institutions and diplomatic channels of the German Foreign Office. However, the Dienststelle also competed with other Nazi party units active in the area of foreign policy, such as the foreign organization of the Nazis (NSDAP/AO) led by Ernst Bohle and Nazi Party office of foreign affairs (APA) led by Alfred Rosenberg. With the appointment of Ribbentrop to be Minister of Foreign Affairs in February 1938, the Dienststelle itself lost its importance, and about a third of the staff of the office followed Ribbentrop to the Foreign Office.

Ribbentrop engaged in diplomacy on his own, such as when he visited France and met Foreign Minister Louis Barthou. During their meeting, Ribbentrop suggested for Barthou to meet Hitler at once to sign a Franco-German non-aggression pact. Ribbentrop wanted to buy time to complete German rearmament by removing preventive war as a French policy option. The Barthou-Ribbentrop meeting infuriated Konstantin von Neurath, since the Foreign Office had not been informed.

Although the Dienststelle Ribbentrop was concerned with German relations in every part of the world, it emphasised Anglo-German relations, as Ribbentrop knew that Hitler favoured an alliance with Britain. As such, Ribbentrop greatly worked during his early diplomatic career to realize Hitler's dream of an anti-Soviet Anglo-German alliance. Ribbentrop made frequent trips to Britain, and upon his return he always reported to Hitler that most British people longed for an alliance with Germany. In November 1934, Ribbentrop met George Bernard Shaw, Sir Austen Chamberlain, Lord Cecil and Lord Lothian. On the basis of Lord Lothian's praise for the natural friendship between Germany and Britain, Ribbentrop informed Hitler that all elements of British society wished for closer ties with Germany. His report delighted Hitler, causing him to remark that Ribbentrop was the only person who told him "the truth about the world abroad". Because the Foreign Office's diplomats were not so sunny in their appraisal of the prospects for an alliance, Ribbentrop's influence with Hitler increased. Ribbentrop's personality, with his disdain for diplomatic niceties, meshed with what Hitler felt should be the relentless dynamism of a revolutionary regime.

==== Ambassador-Plenipotentiary at Large ====
Hitler rewarded Ribbentrop by appointing him Reich Minister Ambassador-Plenipotentiary at Large. In that capacity, Ribbentrop negotiated the Anglo-German Naval Agreement (AGNA) in 1935 and the Anti-Comintern Pact in 1936.

==== Anglo-German Naval Agreement ====
Neurath did not think it possible to achieve the Anglo-German Naval Agreement. To discredit his rival, he appointed Ribbentrop head of the delegation sent to London to negotiate it. Once the talks began, Ribbentrop issued an ultimatum to Sir John Simon, informing him that if Germany's terms were not accepted in their entirety, the German delegation would go home. Simon was angry with that demand, and walked out of the talks. However, to everyone's surprise, the next day the British accepted Ribbentrop's demands, and the AGNA was signed in London on 18 June 1935 by Ribbentrop and Sir Samuel Hoare, the new British Foreign Secretary. The diplomatic success did much to increase Ribbentrop's prestige with Hitler, who called the day the AGNA was signed "the happiest day in my life". He believed it marked the beginning of an Anglo-German alliance, and ordered celebrations throughout Germany to mark the event.

Immediately after the AGNA was signed, Ribbentrop followed up with the next step that was intended to create the Anglo-German alliance, the Gleichschaltung (co-ordination) of all societies demanding the restoration of Germany's former colonies in Africa. On 3 July 1935, it was announced that Ribbentrop would head the efforts to recover Germany's former African colonies. Hitler and Ribbentrop believed that demanding colonial restoration would pressure the British into making an alliance with the Reich on German terms. However, there was a difference between Ribbentrop and Hitler: Ribbentrop sincerely wished to recover the former German colonies, but for Hitler, colonial demands were just a negotiating tactic. Germany would renounce its demands in exchange for a British alliance.

==== Anti-Comintern Pact ====
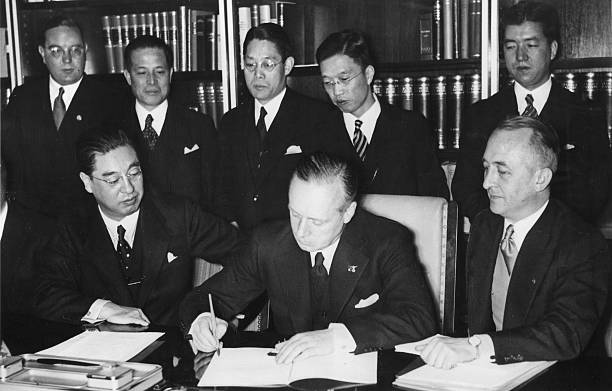
Ribbentrop and the Japanese ambassador to Germany, Kintomo Mushakoji, sign the Anti-Comintern Pact on 25 November 1936.

The Anti-Comintern Pact in November 1936 marked an important change in German foreign policy. The Foreign Office had traditionally favoured a policy of friendship with the Republic of China, and an informal Sino-German alliance had emerged by the late 1920s. Neurath very much believed in maintaining Germany's good relations with China and mistrusted the Empire of Japan. Ribbentrop was opposed to the Foreign Office's pro-China orientation and instead favoured an alliance with Japan. To that end, Ribbentrop often worked closely with General Hiroshi Ōshima, who served first as the Japanese military attaché and then as ambassador in Berlin, to strengthen German-Japanese ties, despite furious opposition from the Wehrmacht and the Foreign Office, which preferred closer Sino-German ties.

The origins of the Anti-Comintern Pact went back to mid-1935, when in an effort to square the circle between seeking a rapprochement with Japan and Germany's traditional alliance with China, Ribbentrop and Ōshima devised the idea of an anticommunist alliance as a way to bind China, Japan and Germany together. However, when the Chinese made it clear that they had no interest in such an alliance (especially given that the Japanese regarded Chinese adhesion to the proposed pact as a way of subordinating China to Japan), both Neurath and War Minister Field Marshal Werner von Blomberg persuaded Hitler to shelve the proposed treaty to avoid damaging Germany's good relations with China. Ribbentrop, who valued Japanese friendship far more than that of the Chinese, argued that Germany and Japan should sign the pact without Chinese participation. By November 1936, a revival of interest in a German-Japanese pact in both Tokyo and Berlin led to the signing of the Anti-Comintern Pact in Berlin. When the Pact was signed, invitations were sent to Italy, China, Britain and Poland to join. However, of the invited powers, only the Italians would ultimately sign. The Anti-Comintern Pact marked the beginning of the shift on Germany's part from China's ally to Japan's ally.

==== Veterans' exchanges ====
In 1935, Ribbentrop arranged for a series of much-publicised visits of First World War veterans to Britain, France and Germany. Ribbentrop persuaded the Royal British Legion and many French veterans' groups to send delegations to Germany to meet German veterans as the best way to promote peace. At the same time, Ribbentrop arranged for members of the Frontkämpferbund, the official German World War I veterans' group, to visit Britain and France to meet veterans there. The veterans' visits and attendant promises of "never again" did much to improve the "New Germany's" image in Britain and France. In July 1935, Brigadier Sir Francis Fetherstone-Godley led the British Legion's delegation to Germany.

The Prince of Wales, the Legion's patron, made a much-publicized speech at the Legion's annual conference in June 1935 that stated that he could think of no better group of men than those of the Legion to visit and carry the message of peace to Germany and that he hoped that Britain and Germany would never fight again. As for the contradiction between German rearmament and his message of peace, Ribbentrop argued to whoever would listen that the German people had been "humiliated" by the Versailles Treaty, Germany wanted peace above all and German violations of Versailles were part of an effort to restore Germany's "self-respect". By the 1930s, much of British opinion had been convinced that the treaty was monstrously unfair and unjust to Germany, so as a result, many in Britain, such as Thomas Jones, Deputy Secretary to the Cabinet (1916–1935), were very open to Ribbentrop's message that European peace would be restored if only the Treaty of Versailles could be done away with.

== Ambassador to the United Kingdom ==
In August 1936, Hitler appointed Ribbentrop ambassador to the United Kingdom with orders to negotiate an Anglo-German alliance. Ribbentrop arrived to take up his position in October 1936, formally presenting his credentials to King Edward VIII on 30 October. Ribbentrop's time in London was marked by an endless series of social gaffes and blunders that worsened his already-poor relations with the British Foreign Office.

Invited to stay as a house guest of the 7th Marquess of Londonderry at Wynyard Hall in County Durham, in November 1936, he was taken to a service in Durham Cathedral, and the hymn Glorious Things of Thee Are Spoken was announced. As the organ played the opening bars, identical to the German national anthem, Ribbentrop gave the Nazi salute and had to be restrained by his host.

At his wife's suggestion, Ribbentrop hired the Berlin interior decorator Martin Luther to assist with his move to London and help realise the design of the new German embassy that Ribbentrop had built there (he felt that the existing embassy was insufficiently grand). Luther proved to be a master intriguer and became Ribbentrop's favourite hatchet man.

Ribbentrop did not understand the limited role in government exercised by 20th-century British monarchs. He thought that Edward VIII could dictate British foreign policy if he wanted. He convinced Hitler that he had Edward's support, but that was as much a delusion as his belief that he had impressed British society. In fact, Ribbentrop often displayed a fundamental misunderstanding of British politics and society. During the abdication crisis in December 1936, Ribbentrop reported to Berlin that it had been precipitated by an anti-German Jewish-Masonic-reactionary conspiracy to depose Edward, whom Ribbentrop represented as a staunch friend of Germany, and that civil war would soon break out in Britain between supporters of Edward and those of Prime Minister Stanley Baldwin. Ribbentrop's civil war predictions were greeted with incredulity by the British people who heard them. Duke Carl Alexander of Württemberg had told the Federal Bureau of Investigation that Wallis Simpson, Edward's lover and a suspected Nazi sympathizer, had slept with Ribbentrop in London in 1936, had remained in constant contact with him and had continued to leak secrets.

Ribbentrop had a habit of summoning tailors from the best British firms, making them wait for hours and then sending them away without seeing him but with instructions to return the next day, only to repeat the process. That did immense damage to his reputation in British high society, as London's tailors retaliated by telling all their well-off clients that Ribbentrop was impossible to deal with. In an interview, his secretary Reinhard Spitzy stated, "He [Ribbentrop] behaved very stupidly and very pompously and the British don't like pompous people". In the same interview, Spitzy called Ribbentrop "pompous, conceited and not too intelligent" and stated he was an utterly insufferable man to work for.

In addition, Ribbentrop chose to spend as little time as possible in London to stay close to Hitler, which irritated the British Foreign Office immensely, as Ribbentrop's frequent absences prevented the handling of many routine diplomatic matters. (Punch referred to him as the "Wandering Aryan" for his frequent trips home.) As Ribbentrop alienated more and more people in Britain, Reichsmarschall Hermann Göring warned Hitler that Ribbentrop was a "stupid ass". Hitler dismissed Göring's concerns: "But after all, he knows quite a lot of important people in England." That remark led Göring to reply "Mein Führer, that may be right, but the bad thing is, they know him".

In February 1937, Ribbentrop committed a notable social gaffe by unexpectedly greeting George VI with the "German greeting", a stiff-armed Nazi salute: the gesture nearly knocked over the King, who was walking forward to shake Ribbentrop's hand at the time. Ribbentrop further compounded the damage to his image and caused a minor crisis in Anglo-German relations by insisting that henceforward all German diplomats were to greet heads of state by giving and receiving the stiff-arm fascist salute. The crisis was resolved when Neurath pointed out to Hitler that under Ribbentrop's rule, if the Soviet ambassador were to give the Communist clenched-fist salute, Hitler would be obliged to return it. On Neurath's advice, Hitler disavowed Ribbentrop's demand that King George receive and give the "German greeting".

Most of Ribbentrop's time was spent demanding that Britain either sign the Anti-Comintern Pact or return the former German colonies in Africa. However, he also devoted considerable time to courting what he called the "men of influence" as the best way to achieve an Anglo-German alliance. In order to achieve this he became a member of the Lansdowne Club, a private members' club in Mayfair. He believed that the British aristocracy comprised some sort of secret society that ruled from behind the scenes, and that if he could befriend enough members of Britain's "secret government" he could bring about the alliance. Almost all of the initially favourable reports Ribbentrop provided to Berlin about the alliance's prospects were based on friendly remarks about the "New Germany" that came from British aristocrats such as Lord Londonderry and Lord Lothian. The rather cool reception that Ribbentrop received from British Cabinet ministers and senior bureaucrats did not make much of an impression on him at first. This British governmental view, summarised by Robert, Viscount Cranborne, Parliamentary Under-Secretary of State for Foreign Affairs, was that Ribbentrop always was a second-rate man.

In 1935, Sir Eric Phipps, the British Ambassador to Germany, complained to London about Ribbentrop's British associates in the Anglo-German Fellowship. He felt that they created "false German hopes as in regards to British friendship and caused a reaction against it in England, where public opinion is very naturally hostile to the Nazi regime and its methods". In September 1937, the British Consul in Munich, writing about the group that Ribbentrop had brought to the Nuremberg Rally, reported that there were some "serious persons of standing among them" but that an equal number of Ribbentrop's British contingent were "eccentrics and few, if any, could be called representatives of serious English thought, either political or social, while they most certainly lacked any political or social influence in England". In June 1937, when Lord Mount Temple, the Chairman of the Anglo-German Fellowship, asked to see Prime Minister Neville Chamberlain after meeting Hitler in a visit arranged by Ribbentrop, Robert Vansittart, the British Foreign Office's Permanent Under-Secretary of State, wrote a memo stating that:

The P.M. [Prime Minister] should certainly not see Lord Mount Temple – nor should the [Secretary of State]. We really must put a stop to this eternal butting in of amateurs – and Lord Mount Temple is a particularly silly one. These activities – which are practically confined to Germany – render impossible the task of diplomacy.

After Vansittart's memo, members of the Anglo-German Fellowship ceased to see Cabinet ministers after they went on Ribbentrop-arranged trips to Germany.

In February 1937, before a meeting with the Lord Privy Seal, Lord Halifax, Ribbentrop suggested to Hitler that Germany, Italy and Japan begin a worldwide propaganda campaign with the aim of forcing Britain to return the former German colonies in Africa. Hitler turned down the idea, but nonetheless during his meeting with Lord Halifax, Ribbentrop spent much of the meeting demanding that Britain sign an alliance with Germany and return the former German colonies. The German historian Klaus Hildebrand noted that as early as the Ribbentrop–Halifax meeting the differing foreign policy views of Hitler and Ribbentrop were starting to emerge, with Ribbentrop more interested in restoring the pre-1914 German Imperium in Africa than the conquest of Eastern Europe. Following the lead of Andreas Hillgruber, who argued that Hitler had a Stufenplan (stage by stage plan) for world conquest, Hildebrand argued that Ribbentrop may not have fully understood what Hitler's Stufenplan was or that in pressing so hard for colonial restoration, he was trying to score a personal success that might improve his standing with Hitler. In March 1937, Ribbentrop attracted much adverse comment in the British press when he gave a speech at the Leipzig Trade Fair in Leipzig in which he declared that German economic prosperity would be satisfied "through the restoration of the former German colonial possessions, or by means of the German people's own strength." The implied threat that if colonial restoration did not occur, the Germans would take back their former colonies by force attracted a great deal of hostile commentary on the inappropriateness of an ambassador threatening his host country in such a manner.

Ribbentrop's negotiating style, a mix of bullying bluster and icy coldness coupled with lengthy monologues praising Hitler, alienated many. The American historian Gordon A. Craig once observed that of all the voluminous memoir literature of the diplomatic scene of 1930s Europe, there are only two positive references to Ribbentrop. Of the two references, General Leo Geyr von Schweppenburg, the German military attaché in London, commented that Ribbentrop had been a brave soldier in World War I, and the wife of the Italian Ambassador to Germany, Elisabetta Cerruti, called Ribbentrop "one of the most diverting of the Nazis". In both cases, the praise was limited, with Cerruti going on to write that only in Nazi Germany was it possible for someone as superficial as Ribbentrop to rise to be a minister of foreign affairs, and Geyr von Schweppenburg called Ribbentrop an absolute disaster as ambassador in London. The British historian/television producer Laurence Rees noted for his 1997 series The Nazis: A Warning from History that every single person interviewed for the series who had known Ribbentrop expressed a passionate hatred for him. One German diplomat, Herbert Richter, called Ribbentrop "lazy and worthless", while another, Manfred von Schröder, was quoted as saying Ribbentrop was "vain and ambitious". Rees concluded, "No other Nazi was so hated by his colleagues".

In November 1937, Ribbentrop was placed in a highly-embarrassing situation since his forceful advocacy of the return of the former German colonies led British Foreign Secretary Anthony Eden and French Foreign Minister Yvon Delbos to offer to open talks on returning the former German colonies in return for which the Germans would make binding commitments to respect their borders in Central and Eastern Europe. Since Hitler was not interested in obtaining the former colonies, especially if the price was a brake on expansion into Eastern Europe, Ribbentrop was forced to turn down the Anglo-French offer that he had largely brought about. Immediately after turning down the Anglo-French offer on colonial restoration, Ribbentrop, for reasons of pure malice, ordered the Reichskolonialbund to increase the agitation for the former German colonies, a move that exasperated both the Foreign Office and the French Ministry of Foreign Affairs.

As the Italian Foreign Minister, Count Galeazzo Ciano, noted in his diary in late 1937, Ribbentrop had come to hate Britain with all the "fury of a woman scorned". Ribbentrop—and Hitler, for that matter—never understood that British foreign policy aimed at the appeasement of Germany, not an alliance with it.

When Ribbentrop traveled to Rome in November 1937 to oversee Italy's adhesion to the Anti-Comintern Pact, he made clear to his hosts that the pact was really directed against Britain. As Ciano noted in his diary, the Anti-Comintern Pact was "anti-Communist in theory, but in fact unmistakably anti-British". Believing himself to be in a state of disgrace with Hitler over his failure to achieve the British alliance, Ribbentrop spent December 1937 in a state of depression and, together with his wife, wrote two lengthy documents for Hitler that denounced Britain. In the first report to Hitler, which was presented on 2 January 1938, Ribbentrop stated that "England is our most dangerous enemy". In the same report, Ribbentrop advised Hitler to abandon the idea of a British alliance and instead embrace the idea of an alliance of Germany, Japan and Italy to destroy the British Empire.

Ribbentrop wrote in his "Memorandum for the Führer" that "a change in the status quo in the East to Germany's advantage can only be accomplished by force" and that the best way to achieve it was to build a global anti-British alliance system. Besides converting the Anti-Comintern Pact into an anti-British military alliance, Ribbentrop argued that German foreign policy should work to "winning over all states whose interests conform directly or indirectly to ours." By the last statement, Ribbentrop clearly implied that the Soviet Union should be included in the anti-British alliance system he had proposed.

== Foreign Minister of the Reich ==
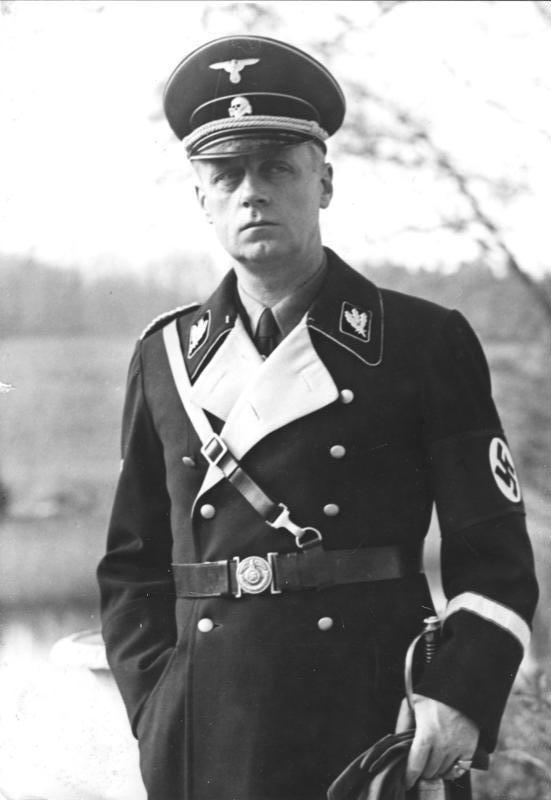
Ribbentrop as SS-Gruppenführer, 1938

In early 1938, Hitler asserted his control of the military-foreign policy apparatus, in part by sacking Neurath. On 4 February 1938, Ribbentrop succeeded Neurath as Foreign Minister. Ribbentrop's appointment has generally been seen as an indication that German foreign policy was moving in a more radical direction. In contrast to Neurath's cautious and less bellicose nature, Ribbentrop unequivocally supported war in 1938 and 1939.

Ribbentrop's time as Foreign Minister can be divided into three periods. In the first, from 1938 to 1939, he tried to persuade other states to align themselves with Germany for the coming war. In the second, from 1939 to 1943, Ribbentrop attempted to persuade other states to enter the war on Germany's side or at least to maintain pro-German neutrality. He was also involved in Operation Willi, an attempt to convince the former King Edward VIII to lobby his brother, now the king, on behalf of Germany. Many historians have suggested that Hitler was prepared to reinstate the Duke of Windsor as king in the hope of establishing a fascist Britain. If Edward would agree to work openly with Nazi Germany, he would be given financial assistance and would hopefully come to be a "compliant" king. Reportedly, 50 million Swiss francs were set aside for that purpose. The plan was never realised.

In the final phase, from 1943 to 1945, he had the task of trying to keep Germany's allies from leaving her side. During the course of all three periods, Ribbentrop frequently met leaders and diplomats from Italy, Japan, Romania, Spain, Bulgaria, and Hungary. During all of that time, Ribbentrop feuded with various other Nazi leaders. As time went by, Ribbentrop started to oust the Foreign Office's old diplomats from their senior positions and replace them with men from the Dienststelle. As early as 1938, 32 per cent of the offices in the Foreign Ministry were held by men who previously served in the Dienststelle.

One of Ribbentrop's first acts as Foreign Minister was to achieve a total volte-face in Germany's Far Eastern policies. Ribbentrop was instrumental in February 1938 in persuading Hitler to recognize the Japanese puppet state of Manchukuo and to renounce German claims upon its former colonies in the Pacific, which were now held by Japan. By April 1938, Ribbentrop had ended all German arms shipments to China and had all of the German Army officers serving with the Kuomintang government of Chiang Kai-shek recalled, with the threat that the families of the officers in China would be sent to concentration camps if the officers did not return to Germany immediately. In return, the Germans received little thanks from the Japanese, who refused to allow any new German businesses to be set up in the part of China they had occupied and continued with their policy of attempting to exclude all existing German and all other Western businesses from Japanese-occupied China. At the same time, the end of the informal Sino-German alliance led Chiang to terminate all concessions and contracts held by German companies in Kuomintang China.

=== Munich Agreement and Czechoslovakia's destruction ===
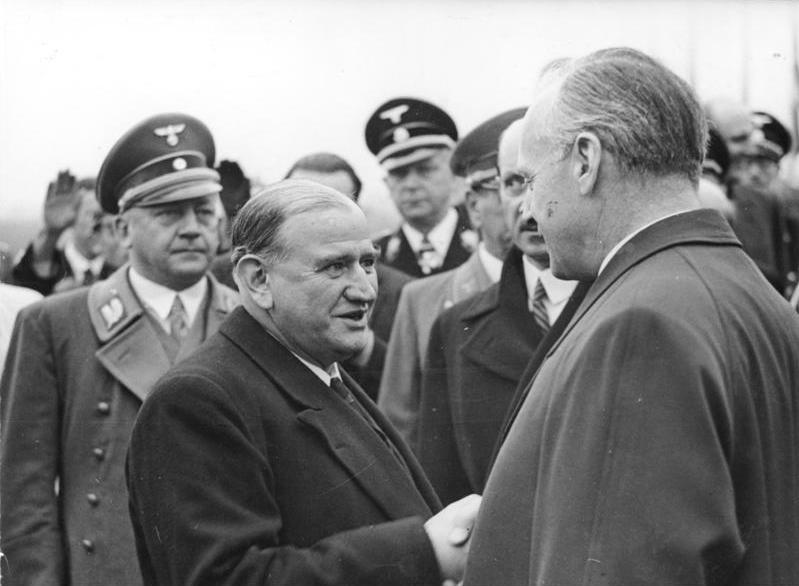
The French Premier Édouard Daladier (centre) with Ribbentrop at the Munich Summit, 1938

Ernst von Weizsäcker, the State Secretary from 1938 to 1943, opposed the general trend in German foreign policy towards attacking the First Czechoslovak Republic and feared that it might cause a general war that Germany would lose. Weizsäcker had no moral objections to the idea of destroying Czechoslovakia but opposed only the timing of the attack. He favoured the idea of a "chemical" destruction of Czechoslovakia in which Germany, Hungary and Poland would close their frontiers to destabilise Czechoslovakia economically. He strongly disliked Ribbentrop's idea of a "mechanical" destruction of Czechoslovakia by war, which he saw as too risky. However, despite all of their reservations and fears about Ribbentrop, whom they saw as recklessly seeking to plunge Germany into a general war before the Reich was ready, neither Weizsäcker nor any of the other professional diplomats were prepared to confront their chief.

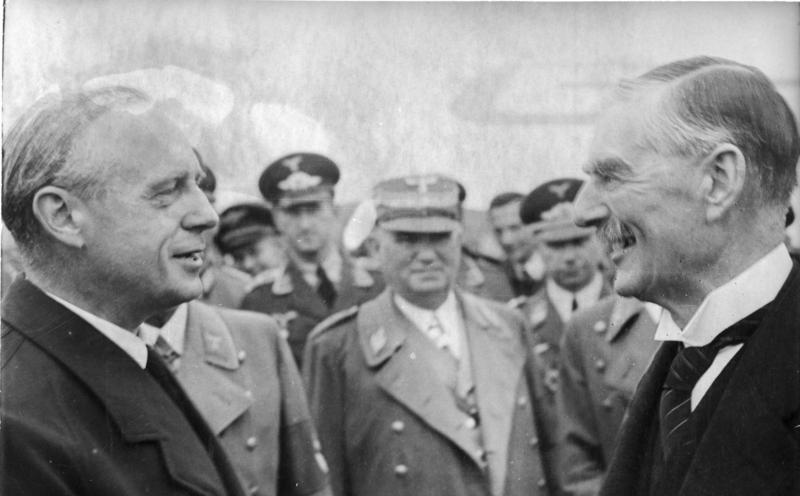
Neville Chamberlain with Ribbentrop at the Munich Summit, 1938

Before the Anglo-German summit at Berchtesgaden on 15 September 1938, the British Ambassador, Sir Nevile Henderson, and Weizsäcker worked out a private arrangement for Hitler and Chamberlain to meet with no advisers present as a way of excluding the ultrahawkish Ribbentrop from attending the talks. Hitler's interpreter, Paul Schmidt, later recalled that it was "felt that our Foreign Minister would prove a disturbing element" at the Berchtesgaden summit. In a moment of pique at his exclusion from the Chamberlain-Hitler meeting, Ribbentrop refused to hand over Schmidt's notes of the summit to Chamberlain, a move that caused much annoyance on the British side. Ribbentrop spent the last weeks of September 1938 looking forward very much to the German-Czechoslovak war that he expected to break out on 1 October 1938. Ribbentrop regarded the Munich Agreement as a diplomatic defeat for Germany, as it deprived Germany of the opportunity to wage the war to destroy Czechoslovakia that Ribbentrop wanted to see. The Sudetenland issue, which was the ostensible subject of the German-Czechoslovak dispute, had been a pretext for German aggression. During the Munich Conference, Ribbentrop spent much of his time brooding unhappily in the corners. Ribbentrop told the head of Hitler's Press Office, Fritz Hesse, that the Munich Agreement was "first-class stupidity.... All it means is that we have to fight the English in a year, when they will be better armed.... It would have been much better if war had come now". Like Hitler, Ribbentrop was determined that in the next crisis, Germany would not have its professed demands met in another Munich-type summit and that the next crisis to be caused by Germany would result in the war that Chamberlain had "cheated" the Germans out of at Munich.

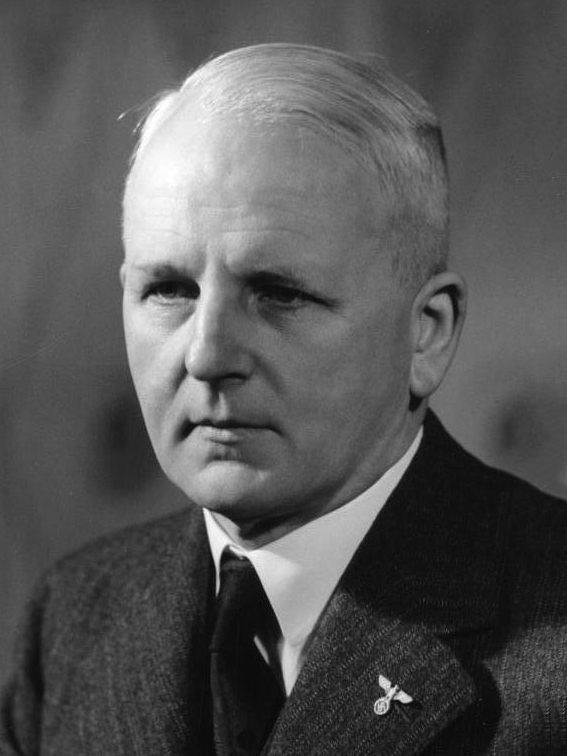
Ernst von Weizsäcker, the Secretary of State at the German Foreign Office, 1938–1943

In the aftermath of Munich, Hitler was in a violently anti-British mood caused in part by his rage over being "cheated" out of the war to "annihilate" Czechoslovakia that he very much wanted to have in 1938 and in part by his realisation that Britain would neither ally itself nor stand aside in regard to Germany's ambition to dominate Europe. As a consequence, Britain was considered after Munich to be the main enemy of the Reich, and as a result, the influence of ardently Anglophobic Ribbentrop correspondingly rose with Hitler.

Partly for economic reasons, and partly out of fury over being "cheated" out of war in 1938, Hitler decided to destroy the rump state of Czecho-Slovakia, as Czechoslovakia had been renamed in October 1938, early in 1939. Ribbentrop played an important role in setting in motion the crisis that was to result in the end of Czecho-Slovakia by ordering German diplomats in Bratislava to contact Father Jozef Tiso, the premier of the Slovak regional government, and pressure him to declare independence from Prague. When Tiso proved reluctant to do so on the grounds that the autonomy that had existed since October 1938 was sufficient for him and that to completely sever links with the Czechs would leave Slovakia open to being annexed by Hungary, Ribbentrop had the German embassy in Budapest contact the regent, Admiral Miklós Horthy. Horthy was advised that the Germans might be open to having more of Hungary restored to its former borders and that the Hungarians should best start concentrating troops on their northern border at once if they were serious about changing their frontiers. Upon hearing of the Hungarian mobilization, Tiso was presented with the choice of either declaring independence, with the understanding that the new state would be in the German sphere of influence, or seeing all of Slovakia absorbed into Hungary. As a result, Tiso had the Slovak regional government issue a declaration of independence on 14 March 1939; the ensuing crisis in Czech-Slovak relations was used as a pretext to summon Czecho-Slovak President Emil Hácha to Berlin over his "failure" to keep order in his country. On the night of 14–15 March 1939, Ribbentrop played a key role in the German occupation of the Czech part of Czecho-Slovakia by bullying Hácha into transforming his country into a German protectorate at a meeting in the Reich Chancellery in Berlin. On 15 March 1939, German troops occupied the Czech areas of Czecho-Slovakia, which then became the Reich Protectorate of Bohemia and Moravia.

On 20 March 1939, Ribbentrop summoned Lithuanian Foreign Minister Juozas Urbšys to Berlin and informed him that if a Lithuanian plenipotentiary did not arrive at once to negotiate to turn over the Memelland to Germany, the Luftwaffe would raze Kaunas to the ground. As a result of Ribbentrop's ultimatum on 23 March, the Lithuanians agreed to return Memel (modern Klaipėda, Lithuania) to Germany.

In March 1939, Ribbentrop assigned the largely ethnically Ukrainian Sub-Carpathian Ruthenia region of Czecho-Slovakia, which had just proclaimed its independence as the Republic of Carpatho-Ukraine, to Hungary, which then proceeded to annex it after a short war. This was significant as there had been many fears in the Soviet Union in the 1930s that the Germans would use Ukrainian nationalism as a tool to break up the Soviet Union. The establishment of an autonomous Ukrainian region in Czecho-Slovakia in October 1938 had prompted a major Soviet media campaign against its existence on the grounds that this was part of a Western plot to support separatism in Soviet Ukraine. By allowing the Hungarians to destroy Europe's only Ukrainian state, Ribbentrop had signified that Germany was not interested, at least for now, in sponsoring Ukrainian nationalism. That, in turn, helped to improve German-Soviet relations by demonstrating that German foreign policy was now primarily anti-Western rather than anti-Soviet.

=== French-German non-aggression pact, December 1938 ===
In December 1938, during Ribbentrop's visit to Paris to sign the French-German non-aggression pact, he had conversations with French Foreign Minister Georges Bonnet, which Ribbentrop later claimed included a promise that France would recognize all of Eastern Europe as Germany's exclusive sphere of influence. The talks with Bonnet were also conducted on the German side by Ernst von Weizsäcker, a high-ranking German diplomat who worked under Ribbentrop.

=== German threat to Poland and British guarantee ===
Initially, Germany hoped to transform Poland into a satellite state, with Ribbentrop and Japanese military attache Hiroshi Ōshima trying to convince Poland to join the Anti-Comintern Pact. By March 1939, German demands had been rejected by the Poles three times, which led Hitler to decide, with enthusiastic support from Ribbentrop, upon the destruction of Poland as the main German foreign policy goal of 1939. On 21 March 1939, Hitler first went public with his demand that Danzig rejoin the Reich and for "extra-territorial" roads across the Polish Corridor. That marked a significant escalation of the German pressure on Poland, which until then had been confined to private meetings between German and Polish diplomats. The same day, on 21 March 1939, Ribbentrop presented a set of demands to the Polish Ambassador Józef Lipski about Poland allowing the Free City of Danzig to return to Germany in such violent and extreme language that it led the Poles to fear their country was on the verge of an immediate German attack. Ribbentrop had used such extreme language, particularly his remark that if Germany had a different policy towards the Soviet Union then Poland would cease to exist, that it led to the Poles ordering partial mobilisation and placing their armed forces on the highest state of alert on 23 March 1939.

In a protest note at Ribbentrop's behaviour, Poland's Foreign Minister Józef Beck reminded him that Poland was an independent country and not some sort of German protectorate that Ribbentrop could bully at will. Ribbentrop, in turn, sent out instructions to the German Ambassador in Warsaw, Count Hans-Adolf von Moltke, that if Poland agreed to the German demands, Germany would ensure that Poland could partition Slovakia with Hungary and be ensured of German support for annexing Ukraine. If the Poles rejected his offer, Poland would be considered an enemy of the Reich. On 26 March, in a stormy meeting with the Polish Ambassador, Józef Lipski, Ribbentrop accused the Poles of attempting to bully Germany by their partial mobilisation and violently attacked them for offering consideration only of the German demand about the "extra-territorial" roads. The meeting ended with Ribbentrop screaming that if Poland invaded the Free City of Danzig, Germany would go to war to destroy Poland. When the news of Ribbentrop's remarks was leaked to the Polish press, despite Beck's order to the censors on 27 March, it caused anti-German riots in Poland with the local Nazi Party headquarters in the mixed town of Lininco destroyed by a mob. On 28 March, Beck told Moltke that any attempt to change the status of Danzig unilaterally would be regarded by Poland as a casus belli. Although the Germans were not planning an attack on Poland in March 1939, Ribbentrop's bullying behaviour towards the Poles destroyed any faint chance of Poland allowing Danzig to return to Germany.

The German occupation of the Czech areas of Czecho-Slovakia on 15 March, in total contravention of the Munich Agreement, which had been signed less than six months before, infuriated British and French public opinion and lost Germany any sympathy. Such was the state of public fury that it appeared possible for several days afterwards that the Chamberlain government might fall because of a backbench rebellion. Even Ribbentrop's standard line that Germany was only reacting to an unjust Versailles Treaty and wanted peace with everyone, which had worked so well in the past, failed to carry weight. Reflecting the changed mood, Conservative MP Duff Cooper wrote in a letter to The Times:

Some of us are getting rather tired of the sanctimonious attitude which seeks to take upon our shoulders the blame for every crime committed in Europe. If Germany had been left stronger in 1919 she would sooner have been in a position to do what she is doing today.

Moreover, the British government had genuinely believed in the German claim that it was only the Sudetenland that concerned it and that Germany was not seeking to dominate Europe. By occupying the Czech parts of Czecho-Slovakia, Germany lost all credibility for its claim to be only righting the alleged wrongs of Versailles. Shortly afterwards, false reports spread in mid-March 1939 by the Romanian minister in London, Virgil Tilea, that his country was on the verge of an immediate German attack, led to a dramatic U-turn in the British policy of resisting commitments in Eastern Europe. Ribbentrop truthfully denied that Germany was going to invade Romania. But his denials were expressed in almost identical language to the denials that he had issued in early March, when he had denied that anything was being planned against the Czechs; thus they actually increased the "Romanian war scare" of March 1939. From the British point of view, it was regarded as highly desirable to keep Romania and its oil out of German hands. Since Germany itself had hardly any sources of oil, the ability of the Royal Navy to impose a blockade represented a British trump card to deter and, if necessary, win a war. If Germany were to occupy oil-rich Romania, that would undercut all of the British strategic assumptions on Germany's need to import oil from the Americas. Since Poland was regarded as the East European state with the most powerful army, Poland had to be tied to Britain as the best way of ensuring Polish support for Romania; it was the obvious quid pro quo that Britain would have to do something for Polish security if the Poles were to be induced to do something for Romanian security.

On 31 March 1939, Chamberlain announced before the House of Commons the British "guarantee" of Poland, which committed Britain to go to war to defend Polish independence, though pointedly the "guarantee" excluded Polish frontiers. As a result of the "guarantee" of Poland, Hitler began to speak with increasing frequency of a British "encirclement" policy, which he used as the excuse for denouncing, in a speech before the Reichstag on 28 April 1939, the Anglo-German Naval Agreement and the Non-Aggression Pact with Poland.

=== Turkey ===
In late March, Ribbentrop had the German chargé d'affaires in Turkey, Hans Kroll, start pressuring Turkey into an alliance with Germany. The Turks assured Kroll that they had no objection to Germany making the Balkans its economic sphere of influence but would regard any move to make the Balkans into a sphere of German political influence as most unwelcome.

In April 1939, when Ribbentrop announced at a secret meeting of the senior staff of the Foreign Office that Germany was ending talks with Poland and was instead going to destroy it in an operation late that year, the news was greeted joyfully by those present. Anti-Polish feelings had long been rampant in the agency and so, in marked contrast to their cool attitude about attacking Czechoslovakia in 1938, diplomats such as Weizsäcker were highly enthusiastic about the prospect of war with Poland in 1939. Professional diplomats such as Weizsäcker who had never accepted the legitimacy of Poland, which they saw as an "abomination" created by the Versailles Treaty, were wholehearted in their support of a war to wipe Poland off the map. The degree of unity within the German government with both the diplomats and the military united in their support of Hitler's anti-Polish policy, which stood in contrast to their views the previous year about destroying Czechoslovakia, very much encouraged Hitler and Ribbentrop with their chosen course of action.

In April 1939, Ribbentrop received intelligence that Britain and Turkey were negotiating an alliance intended to keep Germany out of the Balkans. On 23 April 1939, Turkish Foreign Minister Șükrü Saracoğlu told the British ambassador of Turkish fears of Italian claims of the Mediterranean as Mare Nostrum and German control of the Balkans, and he suggested an Anglo-Soviet-Turkish alliance as the best way of countering the Axis. As the Germans had broken the Turkish diplomatic codes, Ribbentrop was well aware as he warned in a circular to German embassies that Anglo-Turkish talks had gone much further "than what the Turks would care to tell us". Ribbentrop appointed Franz von Papen Germany's ambassador in Turkey with instructions to win it to an alliance with Germany. Ribbentrop had been attempting to appoint Papen as an ambassador to Turkey since April 1938. His first attempt ended in failure when Turkish President Mustafa Kemal Atatürk, who remembered Papen well with considerable distaste from World War I, refused to accept him as ambassador and complained in private the nomination of Papen must have been meant as some sort of sick German joke. The German embassy in Ankara had been vacant ever since the retirement of the previous ambassador Friedrich von Keller in November 1938, and Ribbentrop was able to get the Turks to accept Papen as ambassador only when Saracoğlu complained to Kroll in April 1939 about when the Germans were ever going to send a new ambassador. Papen's attempt to address Turkish fears of Italian expansionism by getting Ribbentrop to have Count Galeazzo Ciano promise the Turks that they had nothing to fear from Italy backfired when the Turks found the Italo-German effort to have been patronising and insulting.

Instead of focusing on talking to the Turks, Ribbentrop and Papen became entangled in a feud over Papen's demand to bypass Ribbentrop and to send his dispatches straight to Hitler. As a former chancellor, Papen had been granted the privilege of bypassing the Foreign Minister while he was ambassador to Austria. Ribbentrop's friendship with Papen, which went back to 1918, ended over that issue. At the same time, Ribbentrop took to shouting at the Turkish Ambassador in Berlin, Mehemet Hamdi Arpag, as part of the effort to win Turkey over as a German ally. Ribbentrop believed that Turks were so stupid that one had to shout at them to make them understand. One of the consequences of Ribbentrop's heavyhanded behaviour was the signing of the Anglo-Turkish alliance on 12 May 1939.

From early 1939 onwards, Ribbentrop had become the leading advocate within the German government of reaching an understanding with the Soviet Union as the best way of pursuing both the short-term anti-Polish and long-term anti-British foreign policy goals. Ribbentrop first seems to have considered the idea of a pact with the Soviet Union after an unsuccessful visit to Warsaw in January 1939, when the Poles again refused Ribbentrop's demands about Danzig, the "extra-territorial" roads across the Polish Corridor and the Anti-Comintern Pact. During the Molotov–Ribbentrop Pact negotiations, Ribbentrop was overjoyed by a report from his ambassador in Moscow, Count Friedrich Werner von der Schulenburg, of a speech by Soviet leader Joseph Stalin before the 18th Party Congress in March 1939 that was strongly anti-Western, which Schulenburg reported meant that the Soviet Union might be seeking an accord with Germany. Ribbentrop followed up Schulenburg's report by sending Dr. Karl Schnurre of the Foreign Office's trade department to negotiate a German-Soviet economic agreement. At the same time, Ribbentrop's efforts to convert the Anti-Comintern Pact into an anti-British alliance met with considerable hostility from the Japanese in late 1938 and early 1939, but with the Italians, Ribbentrop enjoyed some apparent success. Because of Japanese opposition to participation in an anti-British alliance, Ribbentrop decided to settle for a bilateral German-Italian anti-British treaty. Ribbentrop's efforts were crowned with success with the signing of the Pact of Steel in May 1939, but it was accomplished only by falsely assuring Mussolini that there would be no war for the next three years.

=== Pact with Soviet Union and outbreak of World War II ===
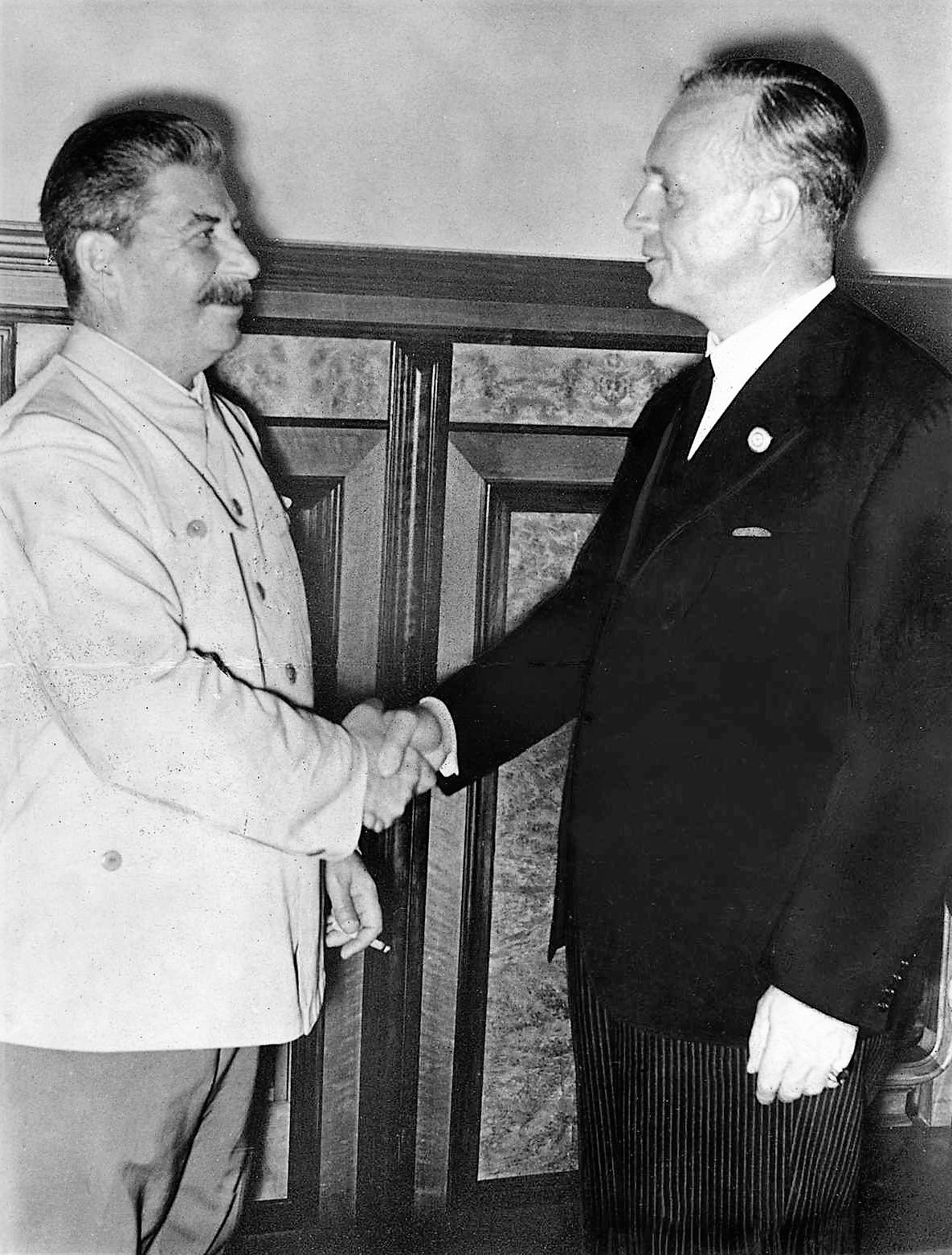
Stalin and Ribbentrop at the signing of the Non-Aggression Pact, 23 August 1939

Ribbentrop played a key role in the conclusion of a Soviet-German non-aggression pact, known as the Molotov–Ribbentrop Pact, in 1939 and in the diplomatic action surrounding the attack on Poland. In public, Ribbentrop expressed great fury at the Polish refusal to allow for Danzig's return to the Reich or to grant Polish permission for the "extra-territorial" highways, but since the matters were intended after March 1939 to be only a pretext for German aggression, Ribbentrop always refused privately to allow for any talks between German and Polish diplomats about those matters. Ribbentrop feared that if German–Polish talks took place, there was the danger that the Poles might back down and agree to the German demands, as the Czechoslovaks had done in 1938 under Anglo-French pressure, depriving the Germans of their excuse for aggression. To block German–Polish diplomatic talks further, Ribbentrop had the German Ambassador to Poland, Count Hans-Adolf von Moltke, recalled, and he refused to see the Polish ambassador, Józef Lipski. On 25 May 1939, Ribbentrop sent a secret message to Moscow to tell the Soviet Foreign Commissar, Vyacheslav Molotov, that if Germany attacked Poland "Russia's special interests would be taken into consideration".

Throughout 1939, Hitler always privately referred to Britain as his main opponent but portrayed the coming destruction of Poland as a necessary prelude to any war with Britain. Ribbentrop informed Hitler that any war with Poland would last for only 24 hours and that the British would be so stunned with this display of German power that they would not honour their commitments. Along the same lines, Ribbentrop told Ciano on 5 May 1939, "It is certain that within a few months not one Frenchman nor a single Englishman will go to war for Poland".

Ribbentrop supported his analysis of the situation by showing Hitler only the diplomatic dispatches that supported his view that neither Britain nor France would honour their commitments to Poland. In that, Ribbentrop was particularly supported by the German Ambassador in London, Herbert von Dirksen, who reported that Chamberlain knew "the social structure of Britain, even the conception of the British Empire, would not survive the chaos of even a victorious war" and so would back down over Poland. Furthermore, Ribbentrop had the German embassy in London provide translations from pro-appeasement newspapers such as the Daily Mail and the Daily Express for Hitler's benefit, which had the effect of making it seem that British public opinion was more strongly against going to war for Poland than it actually was. The British historian Victor Rothwell wrote that the newspapers used by Ribbentrop to provide his press summaries for Hitler were out of touch not only with British public opinion but also with British government policy in regard to Poland. The press summaries Ribbentrop provided were particularly important, as Ribbentrop had managed to convince Hitler that the British government secretly controlled the British press, and just as in Germany, nothing appeared in the British press that the British government did not want to appear. Furthermore, the Germans had broken the British diplomatic codes and were reading the messages between the Foreign Office in London to and from the Embassy in Warsaw. The decrypts showed that there was much tension in Anglo-Polish relations, with the British pressuring the Poles to allow Danzig to rejoin the Reich and the Poles staunchly resisting all efforts to pressure them into concessions to Germany. On the basis of such decrypts, Hitler and Ribbentrop believed that the British were bluffing with their warnings that they would go to war to defend Polish independence. In mid-1939, Ribbentrop sabotaged all efforts at a peaceful solution to the Danzig dispute, leading the American historian Gerhard Weinberg to comment that "perhaps Chamberlain's haggard appearance did him more credit than Ribbentrop's beaming smile", as the countdown to a war that would kill tens of millions inexorably gathered pace.

Neville Chamberlain's European Policy in 1939 was based upon creating a "peace front" of alliances linking Western and Eastern European states to serve as a "tripwire" meant to deter any act of German aggression. The new "containment" strategy adopted in March 1939 was to give firm warnings to Berlin, increase the pace of British re-armament and attempt to form an interlocking network of alliances that would block German aggression anywhere in Europe by creating such a formidable deterrence to aggression that Hitler could not rationally choose that option. Underlying the basis of the "containment" of Germany were the so-called "X documents", provided by Carl Friedrich Goerdeler, in 1938–39. They suggested that the German economy, under the strain of massive military spending, was on the verge of collapse and led British policy-makers to the conclusion that if Hitler could be deterred from war and that if his regime was "contained" long enough, the German economy would collapse, and, with it, presumably the Nazi regime. At the same time, British policymakers were afraid that if Hitler were "contained" and faced with a collapsing economy, he would commit a desperate "mad dog act" of aggression as a way of lashing out. Hence, emphasis was put on pressuring the Poles to allow the return of Danzig to Germany as a way of resolving the crisis peacefully by allowing Hitler to back down without him losing face. As part of a dual strategy to avoid war via deterrence and appeasement of Germany, British leaders warned that they would go to war if Germany attacked Poland, but at the same time, they tried to avoid war by holding unofficial talks with would-be peacemakers such as the British newspaper proprietor Lord Kemsley, the Swedish businessman Axel Wenner-Gren and another Swedish businessman Birger Dahlerus, who attempted to work out the basis for a peaceful return of Danzig.

In May 1939, as part of his efforts to bully Turkey into joining the Axis, Ribbentrop had arranged for the cancellation of the delivery of 60 heavy howitzers from the Škoda Works, which the Turks had paid for in advance. The German refusal either to deliver the artillery pieces or refund the 125 million Reichsmarks that the Turks had paid for them was to be a major strain on German-Turkish relations in 1939 and had the effect of causing Turkey's politically powerful army to resist Ribbentrop's entreaties to join the Axis. As part of the fierce diplomatic competition in Ankara in the first half of 1939 between von Papen and French Ambassador René Massigli with British Ambassador, Sir Hughe Knatchbull-Hugessen to win the allegiance of Turkey to either the Axis or the Allies, Ribbentrop suffered a major reversal in July 1939 when Massigli was able to arrange for major French arms shipments to Turkey on credit to replace the weapons that the Germans had refused to deliver to the Turks.

In June 1939, Franco-German relations were strained when the head of the French section of the Dienststelle Ribbentrop, Otto Abetz, was expelled from France following allegations that he had bribed two French newspaper editors to print pro-German articles. Ribbentrop was enraged by Abetz's expulsion and attacked Count Johannes von Welczeck, the German Ambassador in Paris, over his failure to have the French readmit him. In July 1939, Ribbentrop's claims about an alleged statement of December 1938 made by French Foreign Minister Georges Bonnet were to lead to a lengthy war of words via a series of letters to the French newspapers between Ribbentrop and Bonnet over precisely what Bonnet had said to Ribbentrop.

On 11 August 1939, Ribbentrop met the Italian Foreign Minister, Count Galeazzo Ciano, and the Italian Ambassador to Germany, Count Bernardo Attolico, in Salzburg. During that meeting, both Ciano and Attolico were horrified to learn from Ribbentrop that Germany planned to attack Poland and that the Danzig issue was just a pretext for aggression. When Ciano asked if there was anything Italy could do to broker a Polish-German settlement that would avert a war, he was told by Ribbentrop, "We want war!" Ribbentrop expressed his firmly held belief that neither Britain nor France would go to war for Poland, but if that occurred, he fully expected the Italians to honour the terms of the Pact of Steel, which was both an offensive and defensive treaty, and to declare war not only on Poland but on the Western powers if necessary. Ribbentrop told his Italian guests that "the localisation of the conflict is certain" and "the probability of victory is infinite". Ribbentrop brushed away Ciano's fears of a general war. He claimed, "France and England cannot intervene because they are insufficiently prepared militarily and because they have no means of injuring Germany".

Ciano complained furiously that Ribbentrop had violated his promise given earlier that year, when Italy signed the Pact of Steel, that there would be no war for the next three years. Ciano said that it was absurd to believe that the Reich could attack Poland without triggering a wider war and that now the Italians were left with the choice of going to war when they needed three more years to rearm or being forced into the humiliation of having to violate the terms of the Pact of Steel by declaring neutrality, which would make the Italians appear cowardly. Ciano complained in his diary that his arguments "had no effect" on Ribbentrop, who simply refused to believe any information that did not fit in with his preconceived notions. Despite Ciano's efforts to persuade Ribbentrop to put off the attack on Poland until 1942 to allow the Italians time to get ready for war, Ribbentrop was adamant that Germany had no interest in a diplomatic solution of the Danzig question but wanted a war to wipe Poland off the map. The Salzburg meeting marked the moment when Ciano's dislike of Ribbentrop was transformed into outright hatred and of the beginning of his disillusionment with the pro-German foreign policy that he had championed.

On 21 August 1939, Hitler received a message from Stalin: "The Soviet Government has instructed me to say they agree to Herr von Ribbentrop's arrival on 23 August". The same day, Hitler ordered German mobilisation. The extent that Hitler was influenced by Ribbentrop's advice can be seen in Hitler's orders for a limited mobilisation against Poland alone. Weizsäcker recorded in his diary throughout the first half of 1939 repeated statements from Hitler that any German–Polish war would be a localized conflict and that there was no danger of a general war if the Soviet Union could be persuaded to stay neutral. Hitler believed that British policy was based upon securing Soviet support for Poland, which led him to perform a diplomatic U-turn and support Ribbentrop's policy of rapprochement with the Soviet Union as the best way of ensuring a local war. This was encouraged by decrypts showing the British military attaché to Poland arguing that Britain could not save Poland in the event of a German attack and that only Soviet support offered the prospect of Poland holding out.

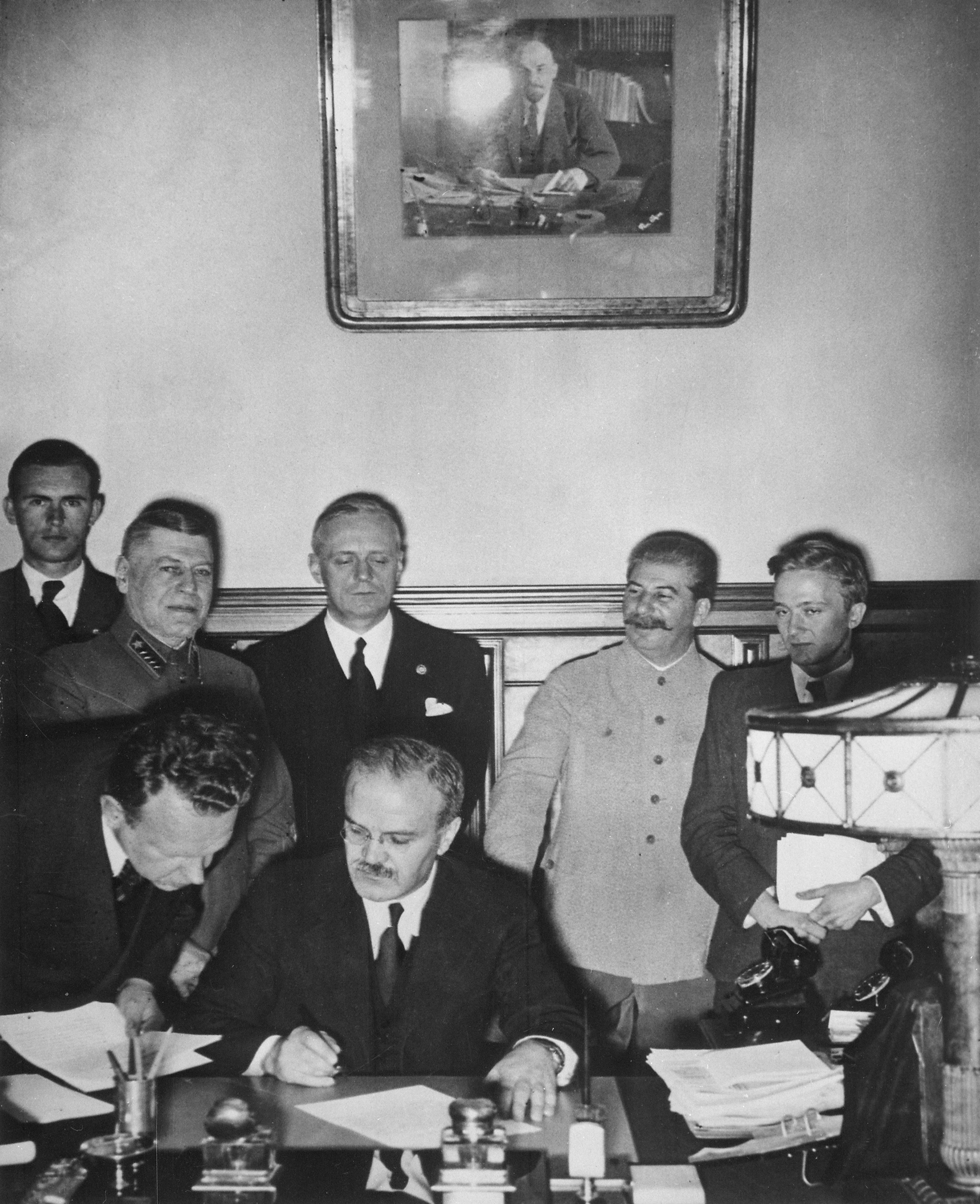
Ribbentrop during the signing of the German–Soviet Treaty of Friendship in Moscow, 1939

The signing of the Non-Aggression Pact in Moscow on 23 August 1939 was the crowning achievement of Ribbentrop's career. He flew to Moscow, where, over the course of a 13-hour visit, Ribbentrop signed both the Non-Aggression Pact and the secret protocols, which partitioned much of Eastern Europe between the Soviets and the Germans. Ribbentrop had expected to see only the Soviet Foreign Commissar Vyacheslav Molotov and was most surprised to be holding talks with Joseph Stalin himself. During his trip to Moscow, Ribbentrop's talks with Stalin and Molotov proceeded very cordially and efficiently with the exception of the question of Latvia, which Hitler had instructed Ribbentrop to try to claim for Germany. Ribbentrop had been instructed to claim the Daugava as the future boundary between the Greater Germanic Reich and the Soviet Union, but had also been ordered to grant extensive concessions to Stalin. When Stalin claimed Latvia for the Soviet Union, Ribbentrop was forced to telephone Berlin for permission from Hitler to concede Latvia to the Soviets. After finishing his talks with Stalin and Molotov, Ribbentrop, at a dinner with the Soviet leaders, launched into a lengthy diatribe against the British Empire, with frequent interjections of approval from Stalin, and exchanged toasts with Stalin in honour of German-Soviet friendship. For a brief moment in August 1939, Ribbentrop convinced Hitler that the Non-Aggression Pact with the Soviet Union would cause the fall of the Chamberlain government and lead to a new British government that would abandon the Poles to their fate. Ribbentrop argued that with Soviet economic support, especially in the form of oil, Germany was now immune to the effects of a British naval blockade and so the British would never take on Germany. On 23 August 1939, at a secret meeting of the Reich's top military leadership at the Berghof, Hitler argued that neither Britain nor France would go to war for Poland without the Soviet Union, and fixed "X-Day", the date for the invasion of Poland, for 26 August. Hitler added, "My only fear is that at the last moment some Schweinehund will make a proposal for mediation". Unlike Hitler, who saw the Non-Aggression Pact as merely a pragmatic device forced on him by circumstances, the refusal of Britain or Poland to play the roles that Hitler had allocated to them, Ribbentrop regarded the Non-Aggression Pact as integral to his anti-British policy.

The signing of the Molotov–Ribbentrop Pact on 23 August 1939 not only won Germany an informal alliance with the Soviet Union but also neutralized Anglo-French attempts to win Turkey to the "peace front". The Turks always believed that it was essential to have the Soviet Union as an ally to counter Germany, and the signing of the pact undercut completely the assumptions behind Turkish security policy. The Anglo-French effort to include the Balkans into the "peace front" had always rested on the assumption that the cornerstone of the "peace front" in the Balkans was to be Turkey, the regional superpower. Because the Balkans were rich in raw materials such as iron, zinc and Romanian oil, which could help Germany survive a British blockade, it was viewed as highly important by the Allies to keep German influence in the Balkans to a minimum. That was the principal motivation behind efforts to link British promises to support Turkey in the event of an Italian attack, in exchange for Turkish promises to help defend Romania from a German attack. British and French leaders believed that the deterrent value of the "peace front" could be increased if Turkey were a member, and the Turkish Straits were open to Allied ships. That would allow the Allies to send troops and supplies to Romania over the Black Sea and through Romania to Poland.

On 25 August 1939, Ribbentrop's influence with Hitler wavered for a moment when the news reached Berlin of the ratification of the Anglo-Polish military alliance and a personal message from Mussolini that told Hitler that Italy would dishonour the Pact of Steel if Germany attacked Poland. This was especially damaging to Ribbentrop, as he always assured Hitler, "Italy's attitude is determined by the Rome-Berlin Axis". As a result of the message from Rome and the ratification of the Anglo-Polish treaty, Hitler cancelled the invasion of Poland planned for 26 August but ordered it held back until 1 September to give Germany some time to break up the unfavourable international alignment. Though Ribbentrop continued to argue that Britain and France were bluffing, both he and Hitler were prepared, as a last resort, to risk a general war by invading Poland. Because of Ribbentrop's firmly held views that Britain was Germany's most dangerous enemy and that an Anglo-German war was inevitable, it scarcely mattered to him when his much-desired war with Britain came. The Greek historian Aristotle Kaillis wrote that it was Ribbentrop's influence with Hitler and his insistence that the Western powers would fail to go to war for Poland that was the most important reason that Hitler did not cancel Fall Weiß, the German invasion of Poland, altogether, instead of only postponing "X-day" for six days. Ribbentrop told Hitler that his sources showed that Britain would not be militarily prepared to take on Germany at the earliest until 1940 or more probably 1941, so that meant that the British were bluffing. Even if the British were serious in their warnings of war, Ribbentrop took the view that since a war with Britain was inevitable, the risk of a war with Britain was acceptable and so he argued that Germany should not shy away from such challenges.

On 27 August 1939, Chamberlain sent a letter to Hitler that was intended to counteract reports Chamberlain had heard from intelligence sources in Berlin that Ribbentrop had convinced Hitler that the Molotov–Ribbentrop Pact would ensure that Britain would abandon Poland. In his letter, Chamberlain wrote:

Whatever may prove to be the nature of the German-Soviet Agreement, it cannot alter Great Britain's obligation to Poland which His Majesty's Government have stated in public repeatedly and plainly and which they are determined to fulfil.
It has been alleged that, if His Majesty's Government had made their position more clear in 1914, the great catastrophe would have been avoided. Whether or not there is any force in that allegation, His Majesty's Government are resolved that on this occasion there shall be no such tragic misunderstanding.
If the case should arise, they are resolved, and prepared, to employ without delay all the forces at their command, and it is impossible to foresee the end of hostilities once engaged. It would be a dangerous illusion to think that, if war once starts, it will come to an early end even if a success on any one of the several fronts on which it will be engaged should have been secured

Ribbentrop told Hitler that Chamberlain's letter was just a bluff and urged his master to call it.

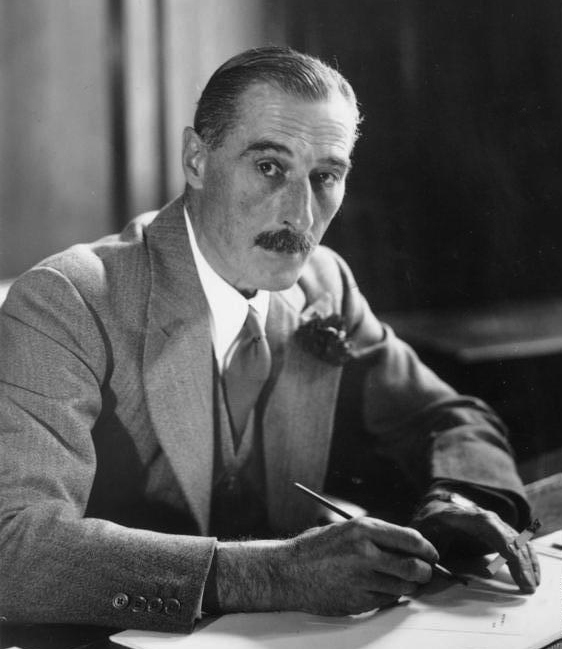
The British Ambassador to Germany, Sir Nevile Henderson, in 1937. Though Henderson was a leading supporter of appeasement, his relations with Ribbentrop were extremely poor throughout his ambassadorship. On the night of 30–31 August 1939, he and Ribbentrop almost came to blows.

On the night of 30–31 August 1939, Ribbentrop had an extremely heated exchange with the British Ambassador to Germany, Sir Nevile Henderson, who objected to Ribbentrop's demand, given at about midnight, that if a Polish plenipotentiary did not arrive in Berlin that night to discuss the German "final offer", the responsibility for the outbreak of war would not rest on the Reich. Ambassador Henderson stated that the terms of the German "final offer" were very reasonable but argued that Ribbentrop's time limit for Polish acceptance of the "final offer" was most unreasonable, and he also demanded to know why Ribbentrop insisted upon seeing a special Polish plenipotentiary and could not present the "final offer" to Ambassador Józef Lipski or provide a written copy of the "final offer". The Henderson–Ribbentrop meeting became so tense that the two men almost came to blows. The American historian Gerhard Weinberg described the Henderson–Ribbentrop meeting:

When Joachim von Ribbentrop refused to give a copy of the German demands to the British Ambassador [Henderson] at midnight of 30–31 August 1939, the two almost came to blows. Ambassador Henderson, who had long advocated concessions to Germany, recognized that here was a deliberately conceived alibi the German government had prepared for a war it was determined to start. No wonder Henderson was angry; von Ribbentrop on the other hand could see war ahead and went home beaming.

As intended by Ribbentrop, the narrow time limit for acceptance of the "final offer" made it impossible for the British government to contact the Polish government in time about the German offer, let alone for the Poles to arrange for a Polish plenipotentiary envoy to arrive in Berlin that night, thereby allowing Ribbentrop to claim that the Poles had rejected the German "final offer". As it was, a special meeting of the British cabinet called to consider the "final offer" and declined to pass on the message to Warsaw under the grounds that it was not a serious proposal on the part of Berlin. The "rejection" of the German proposal was one of the pretexts used for the German aggression against Poland on 1 September 1939. The British historian D.C. Watt wrote, "Two hours later, Berlin Radio broadcast the sixteen points, adding that Poland had rejected them. Thanks to Ribbentrop, they had never even seen them". On 31 August, Ribbentrop met with Ambassador Attolico to tell him that Poland's "rejection" of the "generous" German 16-point peace plan meant that Germany had no interest in Mussolini's offer to call a conference about the status of Danzig. Besides the Polish "rejection" of the German "final offer", the aggression against Poland was justified with the Gleiwitz incident and other SS-staged incidents on the German–Polish border.

As soon as the news broke in the morning of 1 September 1939 that Germany had invaded Poland, Mussolini launched another desperate peace mediation plan intended to stop the German–Polish war from becoming a world war. Mussolini's motives were in no way altruistic. Instead, he was motivated entirely by a wish to escape the self-imposed trap of the Pact of Steel, which obliged Italy to go to war while the country was entirely unprepared. If he suffered the humiliation of having to declare neutrality, it would make him appear cowardly. French Foreign Minister Georges Bonnet, acting on his own initiative, told the Italian Ambassador to France, Baron Raffaele Guariglia, that France had accepted Mussolini's peace plan. Bonnet had Havas issue a statement at midnight on 1 September: "The French government has today, as have several other Governments, received an Italian proposal looking to the resolution of Europe's difficulties. After due consideration, the French government has given a 'positive response'". Though the French and the Italians were serious about Mussolini's peace plan, which called for an immediate ceasefire and a four-power conference in the manner of the Munich conference of 1938 to consider Poland's borders, British Foreign Secretary Lord Halifax stated that unless the Germans withdrew from Poland immediately, Britain would not attend the proposed conference. Ribbentrop finally scuttled Mussolini's peace plan by stating that Germany had no interest in a ceasefire, a withdrawal from Poland or attending the proposed peace conference.

On the morning of 3 September 1939, when Chamberlain followed through with his threat of a British declaration of war if Germany attacked Poland, a visibly shocked Hitler asked Ribbentrop "Now what?", a question to which Ribbentrop had no answer except to state that there would be a "similar message" forthcoming from French Ambassador Robert Coulondre, who arrived later that afternoon to present the French declaration of war. Weizsäcker later recalled, "On 3 Sept., when the British and French declared war, Hitler was surprised, after all, and was to begin with, at a loss". The British historian Richard Overy wrote that what Hitler thought he was starting in September 1939 was only a local war between Germany and Poland and that his decision to do so was largely based on a vast underestimate of the risks of a general war. In effect, Ribbentrop's influence made Hitler go to war in 1939 with the country he wanted as his ally, the United Kingdom, and ally with the country he wanted as his enemy, the Soviet Union.

After the outbreak of World War II, Ribbentrop spent most of the Polish campaign travelling with Hitler. On 27 September 1939, Ribbentrop made a second visit to Moscow. There, at meetings with the Soviet Foreign Commissar Vyacheslav Molotov and Joseph Stalin, he was forced to agree to revising the Secret Protocols of the Non-Aggression Pact in the Soviet Union's favour, most notably agreeing to Stalin's demand for Lithuania to go to the Soviet Union. The imposition of the British blockade had made the Reich highly dependent upon Soviet economic support, which placed Stalin in a strong negotiating position with Ribbentrop. On 1 March 1940, Ribbentrop received Sumner Welles, the American Under-Secretary of State, who was on a peace mission for US President Franklin Roosevelt, and did his best to abuse his American guest. Welles asked Ribbentrop under what terms Germany might be willing to negotiate a compromise peace, before the Phoney War became a real war. Ribbentrop told Welles that only a total German victory "could give us the peace we want". Welles reported to Roosevelt that Ribbentrop had a "completely illiberal, closed and very stupid mind". On 10 March 1940, Ribbentrop visited Rome to meet with Mussolini, who promised him that Italy would soon enter the war. For his one-day Italian trip, Ribbentrop was accompanied by a staff of 35, including a gymnastics coach, a masseur, a doctor, two hairdressers and various legal and economic experts from the Foreign Office. After the Italo-German summit at the Brenner Pass on 18 March 1940, which was attended by Hitler and Mussolini, Count Ciano wrote in his diary: "Everyone in Rome dislikes Ribbentrop".

On 7 May 1940, Ribbentrop founded a new section of the Foreign Office, the Abteilung Deutschland (Department of Internal German Affairs), under Martin Luther, to which was assigned the responsibility for all antisemitic affairs. On 10 May 1940, Ribbentrop summoned the Dutch, Belgian and Luxembourg ambassadors to present them with notes justifying the German invasion of their countries several hours after the Germans had invaded those nations. Much to Ribbentrop's fury, someone leaked the plans for the German invasion to the Dutch embassy in Berlin, which led Ribbentrop to devote the next several months to an investigation aimed at identifying the leaker. The investigation tore apart the agency, as colleagues were encouraged to denounce each other, and was ultimately unsuccessful.

In early June 1940, when Mussolini informed Hitler that he would finally enter the war on 10 June 1940, Hitler was most dismissive, in private calling Mussolini a cowardly opportunist who broke the terms of the Pact of Steel in September 1939 when the going looked rough, and was entering the war in June 1940 only after it was clear that France was beaten and it appeared that Britain would soon make peace. Ribbentrop shared Hitler's assessment of the Italians but welcomed Italy coming into war. In part, that seemed to affirm the importance of the Pact of Steel, which Ribbentrop had negotiated, and in addition, with Italy now an ally, the Foreign Office had more to do. Ribbentrop championed the so-called Madagascar Plan in June 1940 to deport all of Europe's Jews to Madagascar after the presumed imminent defeat of Britain.

=== Relations with wartime allies ===
Ribbentrop, a Francophile, argued that Germany should allow Vichy France a limited degree of independence within a binding Franco-German partnership. To that end, Ribbentrop appointed a colleague from the Dienststelle, Otto Abetz, as Ambassador to France with instructions to promote the political career of Pierre Laval, whom Ribbentrop had decided to be the French politician most favourable to Germany. The Foreign Office's influence in France varied, as there were many other agencies competing for power there. But in general, from late 1943 to mid-1944, the Foreign Office was second only to the SS in terms of power in France.

From the latter half of 1937, Ribbentrop had championed the idea of an alliance between Germany, Italy, and Japan that would partition the British Empire among them. After signing the Soviet-German Non-Aggression Pact, Ribbentrop expanded on this idea for an Axis alliance to include the Soviet Union to form a Eurasian bloc that would destroy maritime states such as Britain. The German historian Klaus Hildebrand argued that besides Hitler's foreign policy programme, there were three other factions within the Nazi Party who had alternative foreign policy programmes, whom Hildebrand designated the agrarians, the revolutionary socialists, and the Wilhelmine Imperialists. Another German diplomatic historian, Wolfgang Michalka argued that there was a fourth alternative to the Nazi foreign policy programme, and that was Ribbentrop's concept of a Eurasian bloc comprising the four totalitarian states of Germany, the Soviet Union, Italy and Japan. Unlike the other factions, Ribbentrop's foreign policy programme was the only one that Hitler allowed to be executed during the years 1939–41, though it was more due to the temporary bankruptcy of Hitler's own foreign policy programme that he had laid down in Mein Kampf and Zweites Buch following the failure to achieve an alliance with Britain, than to a genuine change of mind.

Ribbentrop's foreign policy conceptions differed from Hitler's in that Ribbentrop's concept of international relations owed more to the traditional Wilhelmine Machtpolitik than to Hitler's racist and Social Darwinist vision of different "races" locked in a merciless and endless struggle over Lebensraum. The different foreign-policy conceptions held by Hitler and Ribbentrop were illustrated in their reaction to the Fall of Singapore in 1942: Ribbentrop wanted this great British defeat to be a day of celebration in Germany, whereas Hitler forbade any celebrations on the grounds that Singapore represented a sad day for the principles of white supremacy. Another area of difference was Ribbentrop's obsessive hatred for Britain—which he saw as the main enemy—and view of the Soviet Union as an important ally in the anti-British struggle. Hitler saw the alliance with the Soviet Union as only tactical, and was nowhere as anti-British as his Foreign Minister.

In August 1940, Ribbentrop oversaw the Second Vienna Award, which saw about 40 per cent of the Transylvania region of Romania returned to Hungary. The decision to award so much of Romania to the Hungarians was Hitler's, as Ribbentrop himself spent most of the Vienna conference loudly attacking the Hungarian delegation for their coolness towards attacking Czechoslovakia in 1938 and then demanding more than their fair share of the spoils. When Ribbentrop finally got around to announcing his decision, the Hungarian delegation, which had expected Ribbentrop to rule in favour of Romania, broke out in cheers, while the Romanian foreign minister Mihail Manoilescu fainted.

In late 1940, Ribbentrop made a sustained but unsuccessful effort to have Francoist Spain enter the war on the Axis side. During his talks with the Spanish foreign minister, Ramón Serrano Suñer, Ribbentrop affronted Suñer with his tactless behaviour, especially his suggestion that Spain cede the Canary Islands to Germany. An angry Suñer replied that he would rather see the Canaries sink into the Atlantic than cede an inch of Spanish territory. An area in which Ribbentrop enjoyed more success arose in September 1940, when he had the Far Eastern agent of the Dienststelle Ribbentrop, Heinrich Georg Stahmer, start negotiations with the Japanese foreign minister, Yōsuke Matsuoka, for an anti-American alliance. The result of these talks was the signing in Berlin on 27 September 1940 of the Tripartite Pact by Ribbentrop, Count Ciano, and Japanese Ambassador Saburō Kurusu.

In October 1940, Gauleiters Josef Bürckel and Robert Heinrich Wagner oversaw the near total expulsion of the Jews into the unoccupied zone libre of Vichy France; they deported them not only from the parts of Alsace-Lorraine that had been annexed to the Reich, but also from their Gaue as well. Ribbentrop treated in a "most dilatory fashion" the ensuing complaints by the Vichy French government over the expulsions.

In November 1940, during the visit of the Soviet Foreign Commissar Vyacheslav Molotov to Berlin, Ribbentrop tried hard to get the Soviet Union to sign the Tripartite Pact. Ribbentrop argued that the Soviets and Germans shared a common enemy in the form of the British Empire, and as such, it was in the best interests of the Kremlin to enter the war on the Axis side. He proposed that, after the defeat of Britain, they could carve up the territory in the following way: the Soviet Union would have India and the Middle East, Italy the Mediterranean area, Japan the British possessions in the Far East (presuming of course that Japan would enter the war), and Germany would take central Africa and Britain. Molotov was open to the idea of the Soviet Union entering the war on the Axis side, but demanded as the price of entry into the war that Germany recognise Finland, Bulgaria, Romania, Turkey, Hungary and Yugoslavia as within the exclusive Soviet sphere of influence. Ribbentrop's efforts to persuade Molotov to abandon his demands about Europe as the price of a Soviet alliance with Germany were entirely unsuccessful. After Molotov left Berlin, the Soviet Union indicated that it wished to sign the Tripartite Pact and enter the war on the Axis side. Though Ribbentrop was all for taking Stalin's offer, Hitler by this point had decided that he wanted to attack the Soviet Union. The German–Soviet Axis talks led nowhere.

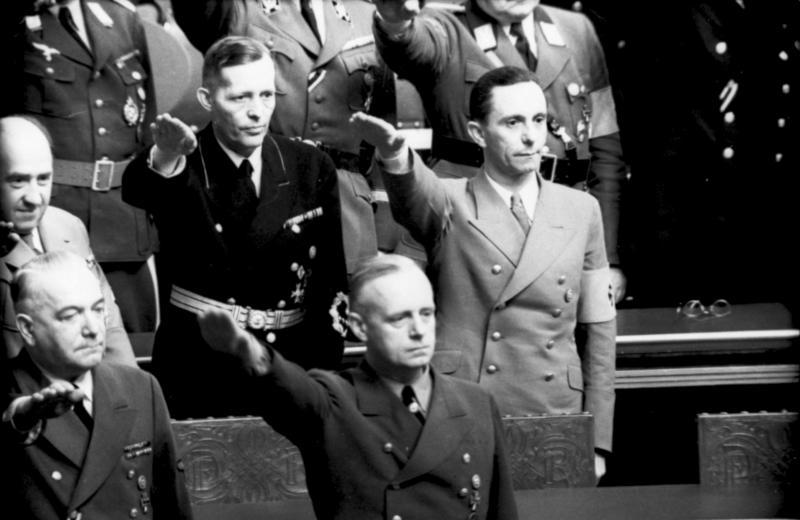
Clockwise from top left: Funk, Krosigk, Goebbels, Ribbentrop and Neurath during a Reichstag session, 1941

As World War II continued, Ribbentrop's once-friendly relations with the SS became increasingly strained. In January 1941, the nadir of the relations between the SS and the Foreign Office was reached when the Iron Guard attempted a coup in Romania. Ribbentrop supported Marshal Ion Antonescu's government and Heinrich Himmler supported the Iron Guard. In the aftermath of the failed coup in Bucharest, the Foreign Office assembled evidence that the SD had backed the coup, which led Ribbentrop to restrict sharply the powers of the SD police attachés. Since October 1939 they had operated largely independently of the German embassies at which they had been stationed. In early 1941, Ribbentrop appointed an assemblage of SA men to German embassies in eastern Europe, with Manfred Freiherr von Killinger dispatched to Romania, Siegfried Kasche to Croatia, Adolf-Heinz Beckerle to Bulgaria, Dietrich von Jagow to Hungary, and Hanns Ludin to Slovakia. The major qualifications of all these men, none of whom had previously held a diplomatic position before, were that they were close friends of Luther and helped to enable a split in the SS (the traditional rivalry between the SS and SA was still running strong).

In March 1941, Japan's Foreign Minister Yōsuke Matsuoka, a Germanophile, visited Berlin. On 29 March 1941, during a conversation with Matsuoka, Ribbentrop, as instructed by Hitler, told the Japanese nothing about the upcoming Operation Barbarossa, as Hitler believed that he could defeat the Soviet Union on his own and preferred that the Japanese attack Britain instead. Hitler did not wish for any information that might lead the Japanese into attacking the Soviet Union to reach their ears. Ribbentrop tried to convince Matsuoka to urge the government in Tokyo to attack the great British naval base at Singapore, claiming the Royal Navy was too weak to retaliate due to its involvement in the Battle of the Atlantic. Matsuoka responded that preparations to occupy Singapore were under way.

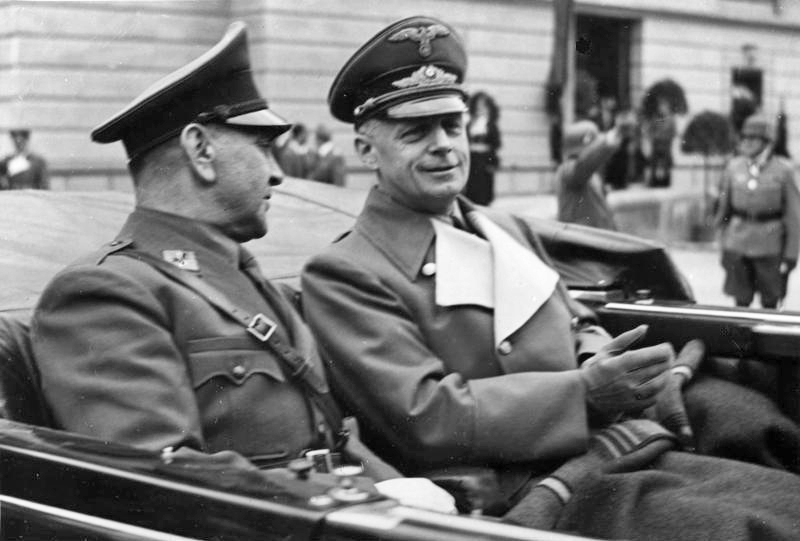
Poglavnik Ante Pavelić (left) of the Independent State of Croatia and Ribbentrop in Salzburg, 6 June 1941

In late 1940 and early 1941, Ribbentrop strongly pressured the Kingdom of Yugoslavia to sign the Tripartite Pact, despite advice from the German Legation in Belgrade that such an action would probably lead to the overthrow of Prince Paul, the Yugoslav Regent. Ribbentrop's intention was to gain transit rights through the country that would allow the Germans to invade Greece. On 25 March 1941, Yugoslavia reluctantly signed the Tripartite Pact; the next day the Yugoslav military overthrew Prince Paul in a bloodless coup. When Hitler ordered the invasion of Yugoslavia, Ribbentrop was opposed, because he thought the Foreign Office was likely to be excluded from ruling occupied Yugoslavia. As Hitler was displeased with Ribbentrop over his opposition to the invasion, the minister took to his bed for the next couple of days. When Ribbentrop recovered, he sought a chance to increase his agency's influence by giving Croatia independence. Ribbentrop chose the Ustaše to rule Croatia. He had Edmund Veesenmayer successfully conclude talks in April 1941 with General Slavko Kvaternik of the Ustaše on having his party rule Croatia after the German invasion. Reflecting his displeasure with the German Legation in Belgrade, which had advised against pushing Yugoslavia to sign the Tripartite Pact, Ribbentrop refused to have the German Legation withdrawn in advance before Germany bombed Belgrade on 6 April 1941. The staff was left to survive the fire-bombing as best it could.

Ribbentrop liked and admired Joseph Stalin and was opposed to the attack on the Soviet Union in 1941. He passed a word to a Soviet diplomat: "Please tell Stalin I was against this war, and that I know it will bring great misfortune to Germany." When it came to time for Ribbentrop to present the German declaration of war on 22 June 1941 to the Soviet Ambassador, General Vladimir Dekanozov, the interpreter Paul Schmidt described the scene:

It is just before four on the morning of Sunday, 22 June 1941 in the office of the Foreign Minister. He is expecting the Soviet Ambassador, Dekanozov, who had been phoning the Minister since early Saturday. Dekanozov had an urgent message from Moscow. He had called every two hours, but was told the Minister was away from the city. At two on Sunday morning, von Ribbentrop finally responded to the calls. Dekanozov was told that von Ribbentrop wished to meet with him at once. An appointment was made for 4 am

Von Ribbentrop is nervous, walking up and down from one end of his large office to the other, like a caged animal, while saying over and over, "The Führer is absolutely right. We must attack Russia, or they will surely attack us!" Is he reassuring himself? Is he justifying the ruination of his crowning diplomatic achievement? Now he has to destroy it "because that is the Führer's wish".

When Dekanozov finally appeared, Ribbentrop read out a short statement saying that the Reich had been forced into "military countermeasures" because of an alleged Soviet plan to attack Germany in July 1941. Ribbentrop did not present a declaration of war to General Dekanozov, confining himself to reading the statement about Germany being forced to take "military countermeasures".

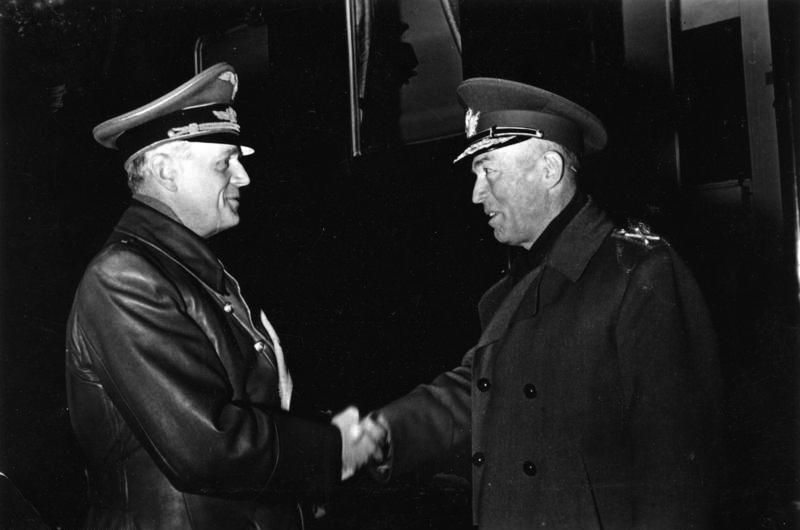
Ribbentrop (left) with Marshal Ion Antonescu, in 1943

Despite his opposition to Operation Barbarossa and a preference to concentrate against Britain, Ribbentrop began a sustained effort on 28 June 1941, without consulting Hitler, to have Japan attack the Soviet Union. But Ribbentrop's motives in seeking to have Japan enter the war were more anti-British than anti-Soviet. On 10 July 1941 Ribbentrop ordered General Eugen Ott, the German Ambassador to Japan to:

Go on with your efforts to bring about the earliest possible participation of Japan in the war against Russia…The natural goal must be, as before, to bring about the meeting of Germany and Japan on the Trans-Siberian Railway before winter sets in. With the collapse of Russia, the position of the Tripartite Powers in the world will be so gigantic that the question of the collapse of England, that is, the absolute annihilation of the British Isles, will only be a question of time. An America completely isolated from the rest of the world would then be faced with the seizure of those of the remaining positions of the British Empire important to the Tripartite Powers.

As part of his efforts to bring Japan into Barbarossa, on 1 July 1941, Ribbentrop had Germany break off diplomatic relations with Chiang Kai-shek and recognized the Japanese-puppet government of Wang Jingwei as China's legitimate rulers. Ribbentrop hoped that recognizing Wang would be seen as a coup that might add to the prestige of the pro-German Japanese Foreign Minister Yōsuke Matsuoka, who was opposed to opening American-Japanese talks. Despite Ribbentrop's best efforts, Matsuoka was sacked as foreign minister later in July 1941, and the Japanese-American talks began.

After the war, Ribbentrop was found to have had culpability in the Holocaust based on his efforts to persuade the leaders of Nazi puppet states and other Axis powers to deport Jews to the Nazi extermination camps. In August 1941, when the question of whether to deport foreign Jews living in Germany arose, Ribbentrop argued against deportation as a way of maximizing the Foreign Office's influence. To deport foreign Jews living in the Reich, Ribbentrop had Luther negotiate agreements with the governments of Romania, Slovakia and Croatia to allow Jews holding citizenship of those states to be deported. In September 1941, the Reich Plenipotentiary for Nazi-occupied Serbia, Felix Benzler, reported to Ribbentrop that the SS had arrested 8,000 Serbian Jews, whom they were planning to execute en masse. He asked for permission to try to stop the massacre. Ribbentrop assigned the question to Luther, who ordered Benzler to co-operate fully in the massacre.

In late 1941, Ribbentrop worked for the failure of the Japanese-American talks in Washington and for Japan to attack the United States. In October 1941 Ribbentrop ordered Eugen Ott, the German ambassador to Japan, to start applying pressure on the Japanese to attack the Americans as soon as possible. Ribbentrop argued to Hitler that a war between the United States and Germany was inevitable given the extent of American aid to Britain and the increasingly frequent "incidents" in the North Atlantic between U-boats and American warships guarding convoys to Britain. He said that having such a war start with a Japanese attack on the United States was the best way to begin it. Ribbentrop told Hitler that because of his four years in Canada and the United States before 1914, he was an expert on all things American; he thought that the United States was not a serious military power. On 4 December 1941, the Japanese Ambassador General Hiroshi Ōshima told Ribbentrop that Japan was on the verge of war with the United States. In turn, Ribbentrop promised that Germany would join the war against the Americans.

On 7 December 1941, Ribbentrop was jubilant at the news of the Japanese attack on Pearl Harbor and did his utmost to support a declaration of war on the United States. He delivered the official declaration to the American Chargé d'Affaires Leland B. Morris on 11 December 1941. In early 1942, following American entry into war, the United States successfully pressured all of the Latin American states, except for Argentina and Chile, to declare war on Germany. Ribbentrop considered the acceptance of declarations of war from small states such as Costa Rica and Ecuador to be deeply humiliating, and he refused to see any of the Latin American ambassadors. He had Weizsäcker accept their declarations of war instead.

In April 1942, as part of a diplomatic counterpart to Case Blue, a military operation in southern Russia, Ribbentrop assembled a collection of anti-Soviet émigrés from the Caucasus in the Hotel Adlon in Berlin with the intention to have them declared leaders of governments-in-exile. From Ribbentrop's point of view, this had the dual benefit of ensuring popular support for the German Army as it advanced into the Caucasus and of ensuring that it was the Foreign Office that ruled the Caucasus once the Germans occupied the area. Alfred Rosenberg, the German Minister of the East, saw this as an intrusion into his area of authority, and told Hitler that the émigrés at the Hotel Adlon were "a nest of Allied agents". To Ribbentrop's disappointment, Hitler sided with Rosenberg.

Despite the often fierce rivalry with the SS, the Foreign Office played a key role in arranging the deportations of Jews to the death camps from France (1942–44), Hungary (1944–45), Slovakia, Italy (after 1943), and the Balkans. Ribbentrop assigned all of the Holocaust-related work to Martin Luther, an old crony from the Dienststelle who represented the Foreign Ministry at the Wannsee Conference. In 1942, Ambassador Otto Abetz secured the deportation of 25,000 French Jews, and Ambassador Hanns Ludin secured the deportation of 50,000 Slovak Jews to the death camps. Only once, in August 1942, did Ribbentrop try to restrict the deportations, but only because of jurisdictional disputes with the SS. Ribbentrop halted deportations from Romania and Croatia; in the case of the former, he was insulted because the SS were negotiating with the Romanians directly, and in the case of the latter, he learned that the SS and Luther had pressured the Italians in their zone of occupation to deport their Jews without first informing Ribbentrop. He had required being kept updated on all developments in Italo-German relations. In September 1942, after a meeting with Hitler, who was unhappy with his foreign minister's actions, Ribbentrop changed course and ordered the deportations to be resumed immediately.

In November 1942, following Operation Torch (the British-American invasion of North Africa), Ribbentrop met French Chief of the Government Pierre Laval in Munich. He presented Laval with an ultimatum for Germany's occupation of the French unoccupied zone and Tunisia. Ribbentrop tried unsuccessfully to arrange for the Vichy French Armistice Army in North Africa to be formally placed under German command. In December 1942, he met the Italian Foreign Minister Count Galeazzo Ciano, who carried Mussolini's request urging the Germans to go on the defensive in the Soviet Union in order to focus on attacking North Africa. Ribbentrop joined Hitler in belittling Italy's war effort. During the same meeting in East Prussia with Count Ciano, Pierre Laval arrived. He quickly agreed to Hitler's and Ribbentrop's demands that he place French police under the command of more radical antisemites and transport hundreds of thousands of French workers as labourers in Germany's war industry.

Another low point in Ribbentrop's relations with the SS occurred in February 1943, when the SD backed a Luther-led internal putsch to oust Ribbentrop as foreign minister. Luther had become estranged from Ribbentrop because the latter's wife treated the former as a household servant. She pushed her husband into ordering an investigation into allegations of corruption on Luther's part. Luther's putsch failed largely because Himmler decided that a foreign ministry headed by Luther would be a more dangerous opponent than the current one under Ribbentrop. At the last minute, he withdrew his support from Luther. In the aftermath of the putsch, Luther was sent to Sachsenhausen concentration camp.

In April 1943, during a summit meeting with Hungary's Regent Miklós Horthy, Ribbentrop strongly pressed the Hungarians to deport their Jewish population to the death camps, but was unsuccessful. During their meeting, Ribbentrop declared "the Jews must either be exterminated or taken to the concentration camps. There is no other possibility".

=== Declining influence ===
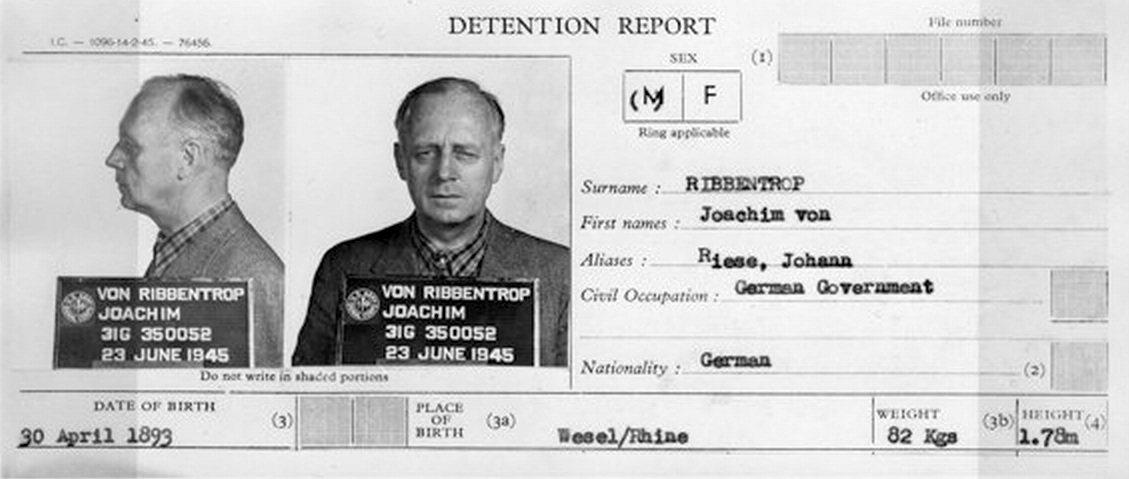
Ribbentrop's detention report and mugshots

As the war went on, Ribbentrop's influence waned. Because most of the world was at war with Germany, the Foreign Ministry's importance diminished as the value of diplomacy became limited. By January 1944, Germany had diplomatic relations only with Argentina, Ireland, Vichy France, the Italian Social Republic in Italy, Occupied Denmark, Sweden, Finland, Slovakia, Hungary, Romania, Croatia, Bulgaria, Switzerland, the Holy See, Spain, Portugal, Turkey, Thailand, Japan, and the Japanese puppet states of Manchukuo and the Wang Jingwei regime in China. Later that year, Argentina and Turkey severed ties with Germany; Romania and Bulgaria joined the Allies and Finland made a separate peace with the Soviet Union and declared war on Germany.

Hitler found Ribbentrop increasingly tiresome and started to avoid him. The Foreign Minister's pleas for permission to seek peace with at least some of Germany's enemies—the Soviet Union in particular—played a role in their estrangement. As his influence declined, Ribbentrop spent his time feuding with other Nazi leaders over control of antisemitic policies to curry Hitler's favour.

Ribbentrop suffered a major blow when many old Foreign Office diplomats participated in the 20 July 1944 putsch and assassination attempt on Hitler. Ribbentrop had not known of the plot, but the participation of so many current and former Foreign Ministry members reflected badly on him. Hitler felt that Ribbentrop's "bloated administration" prevented him from keeping proper tabs on his diplomats' activities. Ribbentrop worked closely with the SS, with which he had reconciled, to purge the Foreign Office of those involved in the putsch. In the hours immediately following the assassination attempt on Hitler, Ribbentrop, Göring, Dönitz, and Mussolini were having tea with Hitler in Rastenberg when Dönitz began to rail against the failures of the Luftwaffe. Göring immediately turned the direction of the conversation to Ribbentrop, and the bankruptcy of Germany's foreign policy. "You dirty little champagne salesman! Shut your mouth!" Göring shouted, threatening to smack Ribbentrop with his marshal's baton. But Ribbentrop refused to remain silent at this disrespect. "I am still the Foreign Minister," he shouted, "and my name is von Ribbentrop!"

On 20 April 1945, Ribbentrop attended Hitler's 56th, and last, birthday party in Berlin. Three days later, Ribbentrop attempted to meet Hitler, but was rejected with the explanation the Führer had more important things to do.

=== Arrest ===
After Hitler's suicide, Ribbentrop attempted to find a role under the new president, Großadmiral Karl Dönitz, but was rebuffed. He went into hiding under an assumed name (Herr Reiser) in the port city of Hamburg. On 14 June, after Germany's surrender, Ribbentrop was arrested by Sergeant Jacques Goffinet, a French citizen who had joined the 5th Special Air Service, the Belgian SAS, and was working with the British Army near Hamburg. He was found with a rambling letter written in English addressed to the British Prime Minister "Wincent Churchill" and Foreign Minister Anthony Eden criticizing British foreign policy for anti-German sentiments, and blaming Britain's failure to ally with Germany before the war for the Soviet occupation of eastern Germany and the advancement of Bolshevism into central Europe. In it Ribbentrop said it was Hitler's "last political will" and a friendship appeal and claimed to have met with Hitler shortly before his death who "having suddenly turned around to me and said: 'You will see, my spirit will arise from my grave and one will see that I have been right.'"

== Trial and execution ==
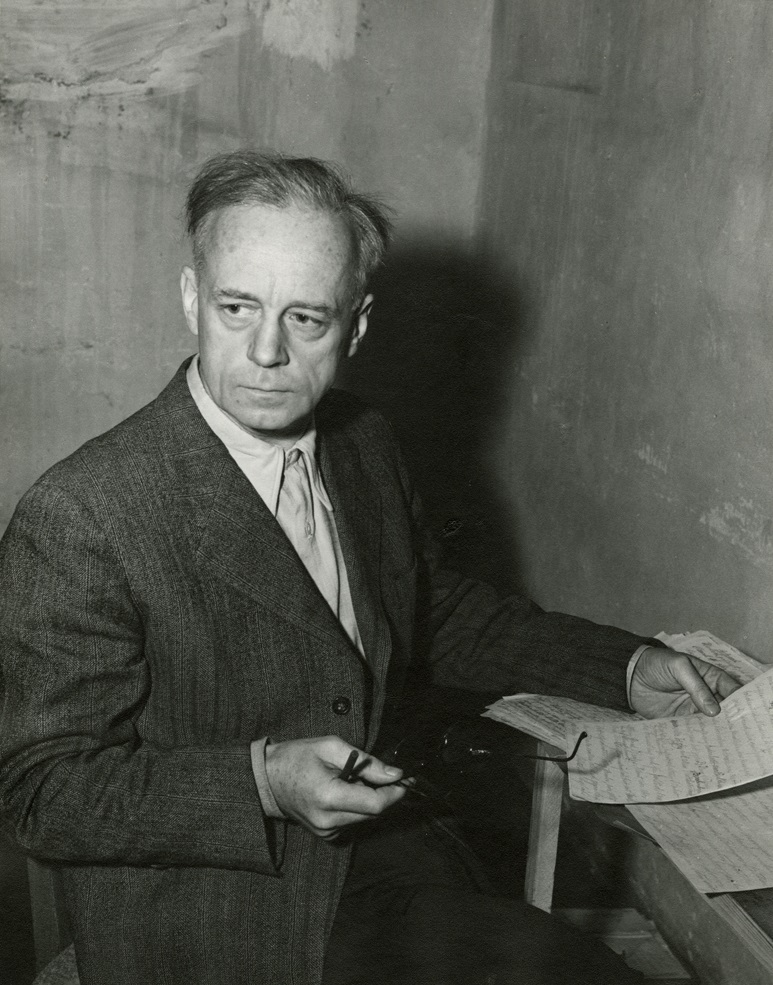
Ribbentrop in his cell at Nuremberg after the trials had concluded

Ribbentrop was a defendant at the Nuremberg trials. Having initially sought a lawyer who had been a member of the Nazi party, Ribbentrop was represented in court by Dr. Fritz Sauter, a lawyer from Munich. During the trial, Ribbentrop attempted to subpoena as witnesses for his defense Lord Vansittart, Lord Beaverbrook, Lord Rothermere, and Lord Kemsley, as well as Lord Dawson of Penn, who at that time was already dead. Ribbentrop fired Sauter as his legal counsel in January 1946, with Airey Neave reporting that, among the conflicts between the two, Ribbentrop was angered that Sauter had not wished him a happy New Year.

The Allies' International Military Tribunal convicted him on four counts: crimes against peace, deliberately planning a war of aggression, committing war crimes, and crimes against humanity. According to the judgment, Ribbentrop was actively involved in planning the Anschluss, as well as the invasions of Czechoslovakia and Poland. He was also deeply involved in the "final solution"; as early as 1942 he had ordered German diplomats in Axis countries to hasten the process of sending Jews to death camps in the east. He supported the lynching of Allied airmen shot down over Germany, and helped to cover up the 1945 murder of Major-General Gustave Mesny, a French officer being held as a prisoner-of-war. He was held directly responsible for atrocities which took place in Denmark and Vichy France, since the top officials in those two occupied countries reported to him. Ribbentrop claimed that Hitler made all the important decisions himself, and that he had been deceived by Hitler's repeated claims of only wanting peace. The Tribunal rejected this argument, saying that given how closely involved Ribbentrop was with the execution of the war, "he could not have remained unaware of the aggressive nature of Hitler's actions." Even in prison, Ribbentrop remained loyal to Hitler: "Even with all I know, if in this cell Hitler should come to me and say 'do this!', I would still do it."

17 October 1946 newsreel of Nuremberg trials sentencing

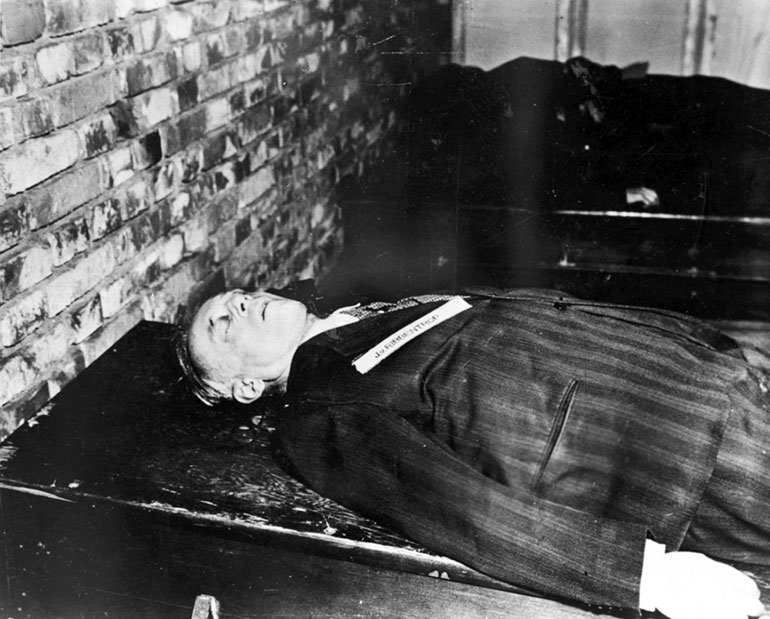
Ribbentrop's body after his execution

Gustave Gilbert, an American Army psychologist, was allowed to examine the Nazi leaders who stood trial. Among other tests, he administered a German version of the Wechsler–Bellevue IQ test. Ribbentrop scored 129, the 10th highest among the Nazi leaders tested. Ribbentrop was also examined by Chief Medical Officer Lt. Col. Rene Juchli who reported that Ribbentrop was "highly neurotic". At one point during the trial, a US Army interpreter asked Ernst Freiherr von Weizsäcker how Hitler could have promoted Ribbentrop to high office. Von Weizsäcker responded, "Hitler never noticed Ribbentrop's babbling because Hitler always did all the talking."

On 16 October 1946, Ribbentrop became the first of those sentenced to death at Nuremberg to be hanged, after Göring committed suicide just before his scheduled execution. The hangman was U.S. Master Sergeant John C. Woods. Ribbentrop was escorted up the 13 steps of the gallows and asked if he had any final words. He said: "God protect Germany. God have mercy on my soul. My final wish is that Germany should recover her unity and that, for the sake of peace, there should be understanding between East and West. I wish peace to the world."

Nuremberg Prison Commandant Burton C. Andrus later recalled that Ribbentrop turned to the prison's Lutheran chaplain, Henry F. Gerecke, immediately before the hood was placed over his head and then he whispered, "I'll see you again." The execution was botched and it took 14 minutes for Ribbentrop to die. His remains, like those of the other nine executed men and of the suicide Hermann Göring, were cremated at Ostfriedhof (Munich) and his ashes scattered in the river Isar.

== In popular culture ==
- In Famous Last Words (1981), a novel by Timothy Findley, Ribbentrop conspires with the Duke of Windsor to kill Hitler and then take over the Nazi Party and Europe.
- In Kazuo Ishiguro's novel The Remains of the Day (1989), Ribbentrop is a frequent visitor to the fictitious Darlington Hall.
- The Robert Harris novel Fatherland (1992) explores an alternate history in which the Nazis have won the war and Ribbentrop is still the foreign minister in 1964.
- In Harry Turtledove's Worldwar: Striking the Balance (1996), imagining an alien invasion of Earth during World War II, Ribbentrop represents Nazi Germany in negotiation of an armistice between the Allied and Axis powers.
- In Fox on the Rhine by Douglas Niles and Michael Dobson (2000) Hitler is killed by Colonel Claus von Stauffenberg during Operation Valkyrie, however Heinrich Himmler stages his own coup and takes over. Himmler sends Ribbentrop to negotiate peace with the Soviet Union.
- In Guy Walters' The Leader (2003), Oswald Mosley becomes Prime Minister in 1937, allying the United Kingdom with the Axis powers. Ribbentrop is seen talking to Diana Mitford in London after the creation of the new alliance.
- In Philip Roth's alternative history The Plot Against America (2004), Charles Lindbergh wins the presidential election of 1940 and allies the United States with Nazi Germany; Ribbentrop visits the White House as part of the two countries' new friendship.

== Film portrayals ==
Ribbentrop has been portrayed by the following actors in film, television and theatre productions:

- Henry Daniell in the 1943 United States propaganda film Mission to Moscow
- Graham Chapman in the 1970 television sketch comedy series Monty Python's Flying Circus
- Henryk Borowski in the 1971 Polish film Epilogue at Nürnberg
- Geoffrey Toone in the 1973 British television production The Death of Adolf Hitler
- Robert Hardy in the 1974 television production The Gathering Storm
- Kosti Klemelä in the 1978 Finnish television production Sodan ja rauhan miehet
- Demeter Bitenc in the 1979 Yugoslavian television production Slom
- Frederick Jaeger in the 1981 British television production Winston Churchill: The Wilderness Years
- Anton Diffring in the 1983 United States television production The Winds of War
- Hans-Dieter Asner in the 1985 television production Mussolini and I
- Richard Kane in the 1985 US/Yugoslavian television production Mussolini: The Untold Story
- John Woodvine in the 1989 British television production Countdown to War
- Wolf Kahler in the 1993 Merchant-Ivory film The Remains of the Day
- Benoît Girard in the 2000 Canadian/US TV production Nuremberg
- Bernd-Uwe Reppenhagen in the 2004 Indian production Netaji Subhas Chandra Bose: The Forgotten Hero
- Ivaylo Geraskov in the 2006 British television docudrama Nuremberg: Nazis on Trial
- Edward Baker-Duly in the 2010 BBC Wales/Masterpiece TV production Upstairs, Downstairs
- Holger Handtke in the 2011 film Hotel Lux
- Orest Ludwig in the 2020 mini-series The Plot Against America
- Emanuel Fellmer in the 2024 German film Führer und Verführer (Goebbels and the Führer)
- Soma Zámbori in the 2024 American Netflix television series Hitler and the Nazis: Evil on Trial
- Soma Zámbori in the 2025 film Nuremberg

== Honours ==
Ribbentrop received many orders, decorations and medals. His role as chief diplomat of the Reich meant he was a natural recipient for diplomatic honours given out by various nations. It is theorised that many of the honours bestowed on Ribbentrop were actually intended for Hitler, who only ever wore at most his WWI Iron Cross 1st Class, his wound badge and his NSDAP Party badge. Hitler refused to accept any foreign decorations and so it is thought that many of the decorations conferred on Ribbentrop were intended for Hitler.

Ribbentrop's full collection of honours were recovered and sold off after the war. He had taken great care to make sure his decorations and other valuable items were kept safe and easily accessible for a potential escape after the defeat of Nazi Germany. Shortly before the end of the war, he hid his decorations and other valuables on the second floor of the Hotel Krone in Umhausen, Tyrol, Austria. He intended to recover them and other valuables before his eventual escape into Switzerland. On 5 May 1945, the 44th Infantry Division entered Umhausen. Shortly after, a captain in the Division, Howard Goldsmith, entered the Hotel Krone intending to stay the night, something he and his men were greatly looking forward to after months of sleeping rough in the winter of the Alpine region. The proprietor of the hotel refused them entry, but they forced their way in, and on reaching the second floor they uncovered trunks filled with clothing and personal items, confidential government documents and looted art from across occupied Europe. Also in the room was a chest which Captain Goldsmith discovered was filled with Ribbentrop's personal orders and decorations.

According to army rules, official and sensitive documents were to be passed on to the relevant authorities, while looted art was to be handed over to the Monuments, Fine Arts, and Archives program for restitution. However, personal items were considered legitimate war souvenirs and after asking for permission, Goldsmith was allowed to keep the items. He had Ribbentrop's decorations shipped back to his home in College Station, Texas. Upon arriving back home he had the items appraised and found that the value at that time was around $40,000 (1945 US Dollars). For years afterwards they were exhibited across the United States, and a few years later the collection was broken up and sold.

== See also ==
- Otto Abetz: German Ambassador to Vichy France (1940–1944)
- Rudolf Buttmann: German Ambassador to the Vatican (1920–1943)
- Hans-Heinrich Dieckhoff: German Ambassador to the United States of America (1937–1938) and Spain (1943–1945)
- Herbert von Dirksen: German Ambassador to the Soviet Union (1928–1933), Japan (1933–1938), and the United Kingdom (1938–1939)
- Glossary of Nazi Germany
- Fritz Grobba: German Ambassador to Iraq (1932–1939, 1941) and Saudi Arabia (1938–1939)
- Ulrich von Hassell: German Ambassador to Italy (1932–1938)
- Eduard Hempel: German Ambassador to Ireland (1937–1945)
- Walther Hewel: German diplomat
- Leopold von Hoesch: German Ambassador to France (1923–1932) and the United Kingdom (1932–1936)
- Manfred Freiherr von Killinger: German Ambassador to the Slovak Republic (1940) and Romania (1940–1944)
- List of Nazi Party leaders and officials
- Hans Luther: German Ambassador to the United States of America (1933–1937)
- Eugen Ott: German Ambassador to Japan (1938–1942)
- List SS-Obergruppenführer
- Heinrich Georg Stahmer: German Ambassador to Japan (1942–1945)
- Hans Thomsen: German diplomat
- Diego von Bergen: German Ambassador to the Vatican (1915–1918, 1920–1943)
- Franz von Papen: German Ambassador to Austria (1934–1938) and Turkey (1939–1944)
- Cecil von Renthe-Fink: German Ambassador to Denmark (1940–1942)
- Friedrich Werner von der Schulenburg: German Ambassador to the Soviet Union (1934–1941)
- Ernst von Weizsäcker: German Ambassador to the Vatican (1943–1945)

== Bibliography ==
- Bloch, Michael (1992). Ribbentrop. London: Bantam Press. ISBN 0-593-01896-6.
- Browning, Christopher R. (1978). The Final Solution and the German Foreign Office: A Study of Referat D III of Abteilung Deutschland, 1940–43. New York: Holmes & Meier. ISBN 0-8419-0403-0.
- Craig, Gordon (1953). "The German Foreign Office from Neurath to Ribbentrop". In Craig, Gordon A.; Gilbert, Felix (eds.). The Diplomats 1919–39. Princeton: Princeton University Press. pp. 406–436.
- Hildebrand, Klaus (1973). The Foreign Policy of the Third Reich. Translated by Anthony Fothergill. London: Batsford. ISBN 0-520-02528-8.
- Hillgruber, Andreas (1981). Germany and the Two World Wars. Translated by William C. Kirby. Cambridge, Massachusetts: Harvard University Press. ISBN 0-674-35321-8.
- Jacobsen, Hans-Adolf (1999). "The Structure of Nazi Foreign Policy, 1933–45". In Leitz, Christian (ed.). The Third Reich. Oxford: Blackwell. pp. 49–94. ISBN 0-631-20700-7.
- Kallis, Aristotle (2000). Fascist Ideology. London: Routledge. ISBN 0415216117. Archived from the original on 30 May 2014.
- Lukes, Igor; Goldstein, Erik, eds. (1999). The Munich Crisis, 1938: Prelude to World War II. London: Frank Cass Inc. ISBN 0-7146-8056-7.
- Manvell, Roger; Fraenkel, Heinrich (2011) [1962]. Goering: The Rise and Fall of the Notorious Nazi Leader. London: Skyhorse. ISBN 978-1-61608-109-6.
- Messerschmidt, Manfred (1990). "Foreign Policy and Preparation for War". In Deist, Wilhelm; Vokmann, Hans-Erich; Wette, Wolfram (eds.). Germany and the Second World War. Vol. I. Oxford, United Kingdom: Clarendon Press.
- Michalka, Wolfgang (1985). "From Anti-Comintern Pact to the Euro-Asiatic Bloc: Ribbentrop's Alternative Concept to Hitler's Foreign Policy Programme". In Koch, H. W. (ed.). Aspects of the Third Reich. London: Macmillan. pp. 267–284. ISBN 0-333-35272-6.
- Michalka, Wolfgang (1993). "Joachim von Ribbentrop: From Wine Merchant to Foreign Minister". In Smelser, Ronald; Zitelmann, Rainer (eds.). The Nazi Elite. London: Macmillan. ISBN 0-333-56950-4.
- Nekrich, Aleksandr Moiseevich (1997). Pariahs, Partners, Predators: German-Soviet Relations, 1922–1941. New York: Columbia University Press.
- Oursler Jr., Fulton (1991). "Secret Treason". American Heritage. 42 (8).
- Overy, Richard (2001). Interrogations: The Nazi Elite in Allied Hands. London: Allen Lane. ISBN 978-0-7139-9350-9.
- Rees, Laurence (1997). The Nazis: A Warning from History. New York: New Press. ISBN 056349333X.
- Rothwell, Victor (2001). The Origins of the Second World War. Manchester, United Kingdom: Manchester University Press. ISBN 0719059585. Archived from the original on 28 March 2023.
- Shirer, William L. (1960). The Rise and Fall of the Third Reich. New York: Simon & Schuster. LCCN 60-6729.
- Snyder, Louis (1976). Encyclopedia of the Third Reich. New York: McGraw-Hill. ISBN 0-07-059525-9.
- Turner, Henry Ashby (1996). Hitler's Thirty Days To Power: January 1933. Reading, Massachusetts: Addison-Wesley. ISBN 978-0201407143.
- Waddington, Geoffrey (1997). "'An Idyllic and Unruffled Atmosphere of Complete Anglo–German Misunderstanding': Aspects of the Operation of the Dienststelle Ribbentrop in Great Britain 1934–1939". History. 82: 44–74.
- Watt, D. C. (1989). How War Came: The Immediate Origins of the Second World War, 1938–1939. London: Heinemann. ISBN 0-394-57916-X.
- Weinberg, Gerhard (1970). The Foreign Policy of Hitler's Germany: Diplomatic Revolution in Europe 1933–36. Chicago: University of Chicago Press. ISBN 0-226-88509-7.
- Weinberg, Gerhard (1980). The Foreign Policy of Hitler's Germany: Starting World War II 1937–39. Chicago: University of Chicago Press. ISBN 0-226-88511-9.
- Weinberg, Gerhard (1994). A World At Arms. Cambridge: Cambridge University Press. ISBN 0521618266.
- Weitz, John (1992). Hitler's Diplomat: The Life And Times Of Joachim von Ribbentrop. New York: Ticknor and Fields. ISBN 0-395-62152-6.
- Wheeler-Bennett, John (1967). The Nemesis of Power. London: Macmillan.
- Windsor, Wallis (1956). The Heart has its Reasons: The Memoirs of the Duchess of Windsor. Bath: Chivers Press.

Diplomatic posts
Preceded by Leopold von Hoesch	German Ambassador to the Court of St. James; 1936–1938	Succeeded by Herbert von Dirksen
Political offices
Preceded by Konstantin von Neurath	Foreign Minister of Germany; 1938–1945	Succeeded by Arthur Seyss-Inquart
