= Paul Schmidt (interpreter) =

German interpreter (1899-1970)

Paul-Otto Schmidt
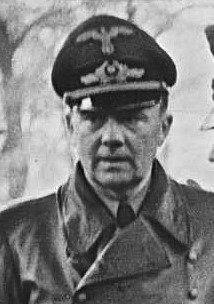
- Schmidt in 1940
- Born: 23 June 1899; Berlin, German Empire
- Died: 21 April 1970 (aged 70); Munich, West Germany
- Occupation: Liaison Interpreter
- Known for: Interpreting for Hitler
- Children: 1
- Military career
- Allegiance: German Empire
- Branch: Imperial German Army
- Service years: 1917–1918
- Conflicts: World War I; Western Front (WIA)

Paul Otto Gustav Schmidt (23 June 1899 – 21 April 1970) was an interpreter in the German foreign ministry from 1923 to 1945. During his career, he served as the translator for Neville Chamberlain's negotiations with Adolf Hitler over the Munich Agreement, the British Declaration of War and the surrender of France.

== Early years ==
In 1917 and 1918, Schmidt was a soldier in the First World War and was wounded on the Western Front. Later, he studied modern languages in Berlin and worked simultaneously for an American newspaper agency. In 1921, he took courses in the Foreign Office to train conference interpreters. Schmidt distinguished himself there by virtue of his outstanding memory. In July 1923, Schmidt, still preparing for examinations, accepted his first assignment for the translating and interpreting service of the Foreign Office at the Permanent Court of International Justice in the Hague. He married in 1925 and had a son the following year.

== Foreign Office ==
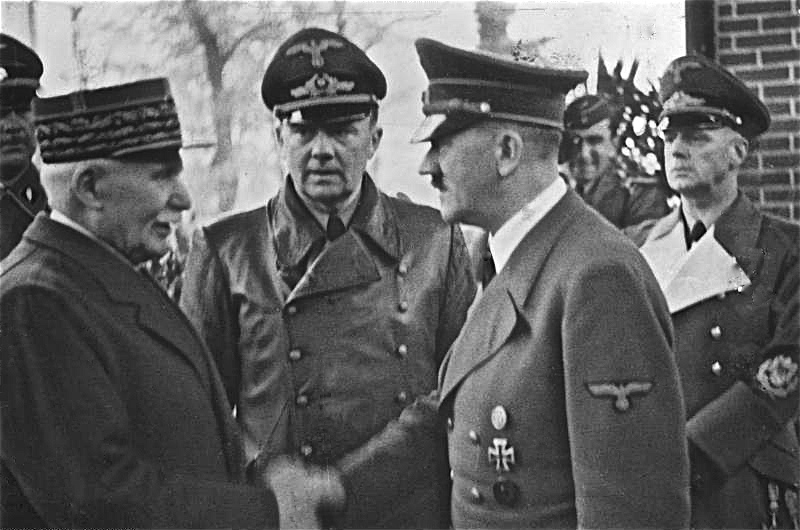
Paul Schmidt (centre left) interpreting between Philippe Pétain and Adolf Hitler, October 1940. The Foreign Minister Joachim von Ribbentrop stands behind to the right.

After studying more languages in Berlin, Schmidt worked briefly in the Reich Foreign Language Office. Starting in 1924, he worked as an interpreter in the Foreign Office. Schmidt interpreted during the Locarno Treaty meetings (1925) and participated in many other important international conferences. He served as an interpreter at the League of Nations (1926–1933) and the London Economic Conference in 1933. Under Reich Chancellor Gustav Stresemann, Schmidt became chief interpreter, a position he retained after Hitler came to power in 1933. Schmidt remained chief interpreter until 1945. At the Munich Conference, he interpreted between Hitler and Neville Chamberlain and Édouard Daladier. Benito Mussolini was fluent in French and spoke a fractured, mangled German. Although Mussolini's German wasn't nearly as good as he pretended, he always refused to use a translator at his meetings with Hitler.

During the war years, he served as Hitler's interpreter during his meetings with Marshal Philippe Pétain and General Francisco Franco. On 12 June 1941, Schmidt served as the translator for the summit between Hitler and General Ion Antonescu of Romania. Antonescu was fluent in French (interwar Romania was such a Francophile nation that fluency in French was de rigueur if one wanted to advance socially), but Hitler spoke no language other than German. At the summit, Antonescu spoke in French and had his remarks translated into German by Schmidt, who also translated Hitler's remarks into French (Schmidt knew no Romanian).

During the meeting, Hitler, via Schmidt, informed Antonescu of the planned "war of extermination" that Operation Barbarossa was intended to be and asked that Antonescu set up a Romanian equivalent of the Einsatzgruppen, a request that Antonescu agreed to. The Israeli historian Jean Ancel wrote sarcastically about Schmidt's post-1945 claim to be a mere "extra on the stage of history" that Schmidt was surely being too modest here in downplaying his role at the Hitler-Antonescu summit that led to the murder of hundreds of thousands of Jews. Schmidt fails to mention the genocidal plans discussed in the Hitler-Antonescu meetings but gives the misleading impression that German-Romanian talks during the war were entirely concerned with military and economic matters. After the 1942 Dieppe Raid resulted in thousands of Canadian soldiers captured, Schmidt was in charge of their interrogations. Schmidt joined the Nazi Party in 1943.

== Postwar ==
Arrested in May 1945, Schmidt was freed by the Americans in 1948.

After he was captured at Salzburg in May 1945, Schmidt asserted that there was little anti-Semitism in Germany until Hitler imported it from Austria. He said: "Hitler's biggest mistakes were his campaign against the Jews and his policy of imperialism."

In 1946, he testified at the Nuremberg trials, where psychiatrist Leon Goldensohn noted and later published conversations with him. In 1947, he testified for the prosecution against the directors of IG Farben. In 1952, he founded the Sprachen & Dolmetscher Institut in Munich, a college where students could learn languages and become translators and interpreters. He retired in 1967.

== Memoirs ==
Entitled An Extra on the Diplomatic Stage, Schmidt's memoirs cover his 21 years as an important eyewitness to European foreign policy. They begin with his frontline experiences during the First World War at the German spring offensive of 1918 and continue with his work for the German chancellors before 1933.

The English edition of the book, Hitler's Interpreter ^{OCLC 1122735}, skips that material and describes only the Hitler years (1933–1945). The memoirs present an atmospheric but detailed portrait of the highest level of the Third Reich. He has this advice for interpreters in training:

"Over the years I have arrived at the conviction that a good diplomatic interpreter must possess three characteristics: Most important, he must, paradoxically, be able to be silent; he must be expert in the subject he is translating; and only in third place is his mastery of the language he translates".

According to Christian Kammertöns, Schmidt presents himself (and Germany) in the memoirs more as a victim, and does not mention the Holocaust.

== Sources ==
- Lehrer, Steven (2006). The Reich Chancellery and Führerbunker Complex: An Illustrated History of the Seat of the Nazi Regime. McFarland. p. 214. ISBN 0-7864-2393-5.
- Lehrer, Steven (2002). Hitler Sites: A City-by-city Guidebook (Austria, Germany, France, United States). McFarland. p. 224. ISBN 0-7864-1045-0.
- Goldensohn, Leon N., and Gellately, Robert (ed.): The Nuremberg Interviews, Alfred A. Knopf, New York, 2004 ISBN 0-375-41469-X
