= Faking Hitler =

German television miniseries (2021)

Faking Hitler is a German television miniseries that was released on RTL+ on 30 November 2021. It is a partial dramatization of the events surrounding the publication of the forged Hitler Diaries in the early 1980s. The title Faking Hitler was interpreted as an allusion to the book Selling Hitler: The Story of the Hitler Diaries (1986) by Robert Harris and the 1991 series of the same name.

== Plot ==
In 1981, Gerd Heidemann a reporter with the German magazine Stern, discovers what he believes are the multi-volume diaries of Adolf Hitler, persuading Stern to purchase and serialize them. Although eminent historians such as Hugh Trevor-Roper had verified the diaries as authentic, it is discovered after the publication of the first extract that the diaries are crude forgeries by Stuttgart criminal Konrad Kujau.

== Production ==
The miniseries was shot in Hamburg and North Rhine-Westphalia from April 7 to May 29, 2021. On October 23, 2021, the miniseries premiered at the Filmpalast in Cologne as part of Film Festival Cologne.

== Awards ==
The series was nominated for the 2022 Venice TV Award.

== See also ==
- Schtonk!, 1992 German comedy film about the same subject matter
