= Hitler Diaries =

Forged journals purportedly by Adolf Hitler

"Hitler's diaries discovered". Stern's front page on 28 April 1983

The Hitler Diaries (Hitler-Tagebücher) were a series of sixty volumes of journals purportedly written by Adolf Hitler, but forged by Konrad Kujau between 1981 and 1983. The diaries were purchased in 1983 for 9.3 million Deutsche Marks (£2.3 million or $3.7 million) by the West German news magazine Stern, which sold serialisation rights to several news organisations. One of the publications involved was The Sunday Times, who asked their independent director, the historian Hugh Trevor-Roper, to authenticate the diaries; he did so, pronouncing them genuine. At the press conference to announce the publication, Trevor-Roper announced that on reflection he had changed his mind, and other historians also raised questions concerning their validity. Rigorous forensic analysis, which had not been performed previously, quickly confirmed that the diaries were fakes.

Kujau, born and raised in East Germany, had a history of petty crime and deception. In the mid-1970s he began selling Nazi memorabilia which he had smuggled from the East, but found he could raise the prices by forging additional authentication details to associate ordinary souvenirs to the Nazi leaders. He began forging paintings by Hitler and an increasing number of notes, poems and letters, until he produced his first diary in the mid-to-late 1970s. The West German journalist with Stern who "discovered" the diaries and was involved in their purchase was Gerd Heidemann, who had an obsession with the Nazis. When Stern started buying the diaries, Heidemann stole a significant proportion of the money.

Kujau and Heidemann spent time in prison for their parts in the fraud, and several newspaper editors lost their jobs. The story of the scandal was the basis for the films Selling Hitler (1991) for the British channel ITV, the German film Schtonk! (1992), and the television series Faking Hitler (2021).

== Background ==
=== Operation Seraglio ===
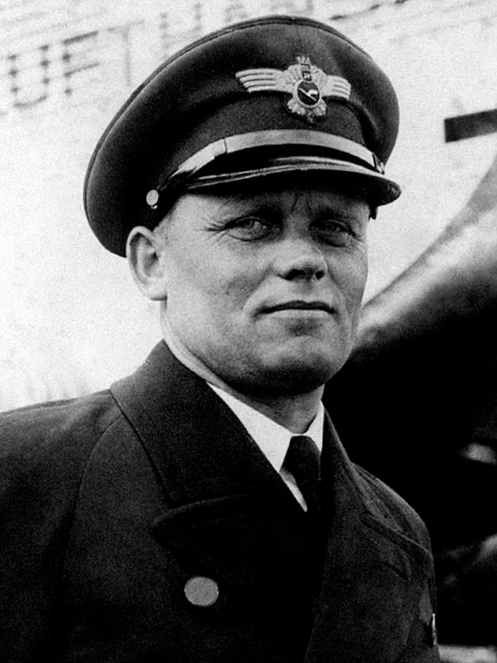
General Hans Baur, Hitler's personal pilot

On 20 April 1945—Adolf Hitler's 56th birthday—Soviet troops were on the verge of taking Berlin and the Western Allies had already taken several German cities. Hitler's private secretary, Martin Bormann, initiated Operation Seraglio, a plan to evacuate the key and favoured members of Hitler's entourage from the Berlin bunker where they were based, the Führerbunker, to an Alpine command centre near Berchtesgaden—Hitler's retreat in southern Germany. Ten aeroplanes flew out from Gatow airfield under the overall command of General Hans Baur, Hitler's personal pilot. The final flight out was a Junkers Ju 352 transport plane, piloted by Major Friedrich Gundlfinger—on board were ten heavy chests under the supervision of Hitler's personal valet, Sergeant Wilhelm Arndt. The aeroplane crashed into the Heidenholz Forest, near the Czechoslovak border.

Some of the more useful parts of Gundlfinger's aeroplane were appropriated by locals before the police and SS cordoned off the crash site. When Baur told Hitler what had happened, the German leader expressed grief at the loss of Arndt, one of his most favoured servants, and added: "I entrusted him with extremely valuable documents which would show posterity the truth of my actions!" Apart from this quoted sentence, there is no indication of what was in the boxes. The last of the crash's two survivors died in April 1980, and Bormann had died after leaving the Berlin bunker following Hitler's suicide on 30 April 1945. In the decades following the war, the possibility of a hidden cache of private papers belonging to Hitler became, according to the journalist Robert Harris, a "tantalizing state of affairs [that] was to provide the perfect scenario for forgery".

=== Konrad Kujau ===
Konrad Kujau was born in 1938 in Löbau, near Dresden, in what would become East Germany. His parents, a shoemaker and his wife, had both joined the Nazi Party in 1933. The boy grew up believing in the Nazi ideals and idolising Hitler; Germany's defeat and Hitler's suicide in 1945 did not temper his enthusiasm for the Nazi cause. He held a series of menial jobs until 1957, when a warrant was issued for his arrest in connection with the theft of a microphone from the Löbau Youth Club. He fled to Stuttgart, West Germany, and soon drifted into temporary work and petty crime. (Note: In 1959 he was fined 80 Deutsche Marks for stealing tobacco; in 1960 he was sent to prison for nine months after being caught breaking into a storeroom to steal cognac; in 1961 he spent more time in prison after stealing five crates of fruit; six months later he was arrested after getting into a fight with his employer while employed as a cook in a bar.) After running a dance bar during the early 1960s with his girlfriend, Edith Lieblang—whom he later married—Kujau began to create a fictional background for himself. He told people that his real name was Peter Fischer, changed his date of birth by two years, and altered the story of his time in East Germany. By 1963 the bar had begun to suffer financial difficulties, and Kujau started his career as a counterfeiter, forging 27 Deutsche Marks' (DM) worth of luncheon vouchers; (Note: In April 1983—the time when Stern launched the diaries—UK£1 was worth 3.76 DMs and US$1 was worth 2.44 DMs.) he was caught and sentenced to five days in prison. On his release he and his wife formed the Lieblang Cleaning Company, although it provided little income for them. In March 1968, at a routine check at Kujau's lodgings, the police established he was living under a false identity and he was sent to Stuttgart's Stammheim Prison.

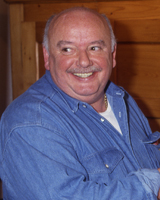
Konrad Kujau in 1992

In 1970 Kujau visited his family in East Germany and discovered that many of the locals had Nazi memorabilia, contrary to the laws of the communist government. He saw an opportunity to buy the material cheaply on the black market, and make a profit in the West, where the increasing demand among Stuttgart collectors was raising memorabilia prices up to ten times the amount he would pay. The trade was illegal in East Germany, and the export of what were deemed items of cultural heritage was banned. Among the items smuggled out of East Germany were weapons. (Note: Both the Kujaus were stopped crossing the border between East and West Germany, although only once each, and with no penalty but the confiscation of the contraband. Kujau would occasionally wear a pistol and had an obsession with guns. One night in February 1973, while drunk, he took a loaded machine gun to confront a man he thought had been slashing the tyres of the cleaning company van. The man ran off and Kujau chased him into the wrong doorway, where he terrified a prostitute; her screams brought the police, who arrested Kujau. When they searched his flat they found five pistols, a machine gun, a shotgun and three rifles. Kujau apologised and was given a fine.)

In 1974 Kujau rented a shop into which he placed his Nazi memorabilia; the outlet also became the venue for late-night drinking sessions with friends and fellow collectors, including Wolfgang Schulze, who lived in the US and became Kujau's agent there. Kujau inflated the value of items in his shop by forging additional authentication details—for example a genuine First World War helmet, worth a few marks, became considerably more valuable after Kujau forged a note indicating that Hitler had worn it at Ypres in late October 1914. In addition to notes by Hitler, he produced documents supposedly handwritten by Bormann, Rudolf Hess, Heinrich Himmler, Hermann Göring and Joseph Goebbels. He forged passable imitations of his subjects' genuine handwriting, but the rest of the work was crude: Kujau used modern stationery such as Letraset to create letterheads, and he tried to make his products look suitably old by pouring tea over them. Mistakes in spelling or grammar were relatively common, particularly when he forged in English; a supposed copy of the 1938 Munich Agreement between Hitler and Neville Chamberlain read, in part:

We regard the areement signet last night and the Anglo-German Naval Agreement as symbolic of the desire of our two peoples never to go to war with one another againe.

In the mid-to-late 1970s Kujau, an able amateur artist, turned to producing paintings which he claimed were by Hitler, who had been an amateur artist as a young man. (Note: Hitler had painted during his time in the trenches of the First World War until his paints and brushes were stolen in a convalescence camp at the end of the war.) Having found a market for his forged works, Kujau created Hitler paintings depicting subjects his buyers expressed interest in, such as cartoons, nudes and men in action—all subjects that Hitler never painted, nor would want to paint, according to Charles Hamilton, a handwriting expert and author of books on forgery. These paintings were often accompanied by small notes, purportedly from Hitler. The paintings were profitable for Kujau. To explain his access to the memorabilia he invented several sources in East Germany, including a former Nazi general, the bribable director of a museum and his own brother, whom he re-invented as a general in the East German army.

Having found success in passing off his forged notes as those of Hitler, Kujau grew more ambitious and copied, by hand, the text from both volumes of Mein Kampf, even though the originals had been completed by typewriter. Kujau also produced an introduction to a third volume of the work. He sold these manuscripts to one of his regular customers, Fritz Stiefel, a collector of Nazi memorabilia who accepted them and many other Kujau products as genuine. (Note: According to a later investigation by the Hamburg state prosecutor, Stiefel spent 250,000 DMs buying memorabilia from Kujau. His obsession with obtaining paintings, notes, speeches, poems and letters purportedly from Hitler led to him defrauding his own company by 180,000 DMs.) Kujau also began forging a series of war poems by Hitler, which were so amateurish that Kujau later conceded that "a fourteen-year-old collector would have recognised it as a forgery".

=== Gerd Heidemann ===
Gerd Heidemann was born in Hamburg in 1931. During the rise of Hitler his parents remained apolitical, but Heidemann, like many other young boys, joined the Hitler Youth. After the war he trained as an electrician, and pursued an interest in photography. He began working in a photographic laboratory and became a freelance photographer for the Deutsche Presse-Agentur and Keystone news agencies, as well as some local Hamburg newspapers. He had his first work published in Stern in 1951 and four years later joined the paper as a full-time member of staff. From 1961 he covered wars and hostilities across Africa and the Middle East; (Note: Heidemann photographed and reported on action in the Congo, Biafra, Guinea-Bissau, Mozambique, Iraq, Jordan, Israel, Uganda, Beirut and Oman.) he became obsessed with these conflicts and other stories on which he worked, such as the search for the identity of the German writer B. Traven. Although he was an excellent researcher—his colleagues called him der Spürhund, the Bloodhound—he would not know when to stop investigating, which led to other writers having to finish the stories from large quantities of notes.

In January 1973, on behalf of Stern, Heidemann photographed the Carin II, a yacht that formerly belonged to Göring. (Note: Göring had been given the yacht in 1937 and had named it after his late wife. At the end of the war it was impounded by Field Marshal Bernard Montgomery, who presented it to the British royal family. They renamed it the Royal Albert, and then changed its name to the Prince Charles, after his birth. In 1960 it was returned to Göring's widow.) The boat was in a poor state of repair and expensive to maintain, but Heidemann took a mortgage on his Hamburg flat and purchased it. While researching the history of the yacht, Heidemann interviewed Göring's daughter, Edda, after which the couple began an affair. Through this relationship and his ownership of the boat he was introduced to a circle of former Nazis. He began to hold parties on the Carin II, with the former SS generals Karl Wolff and Wilhelm Mohnke as the guests of honour. Wolff and Mohnke were witnesses at Heidemann's wedding to his third wife in 1979; the couple went on honeymoon to South America accompanied by Wolff, where they met more ex-Nazis, including Walter Rauff and Klaus Barbie, who were both wanted in the West for war crimes.

The purchase of the yacht caused Heidemann financial problems, and in 1976 he agreed terms with Gruner + Jahr, Stern's parent company, to produce a book based on the conversations he was having with the former soldiers and SS men. When the book went unwritten—the material provided by the former SS officers was not sufficiently interesting or verifiable for publication—Heidemann borrowed increasingly large sums from his employers to pay for the boat's upkeep. In June 1978 he advertised the boat for sale, asking 1.1 million DMs; he received no offers. Mohnke recommended that Heidemann speak to Jakob Tiefenthaeler, a Nazi memorabilia collector and a former member of the SS. Tiefenthaeler was not in a position to buy the yacht, but was happy to act as an agent; his endeavours did not produce a sale. Realising Heidemann's financial circumstances, Tiefenthaeler provided him with names of other collectors in the Stuttgart area. The journalist made a trip to the south of Germany and met Stiefel, who purchased some of Göring's effects.

=== Stern, The Sunday Times and Newsweek ===
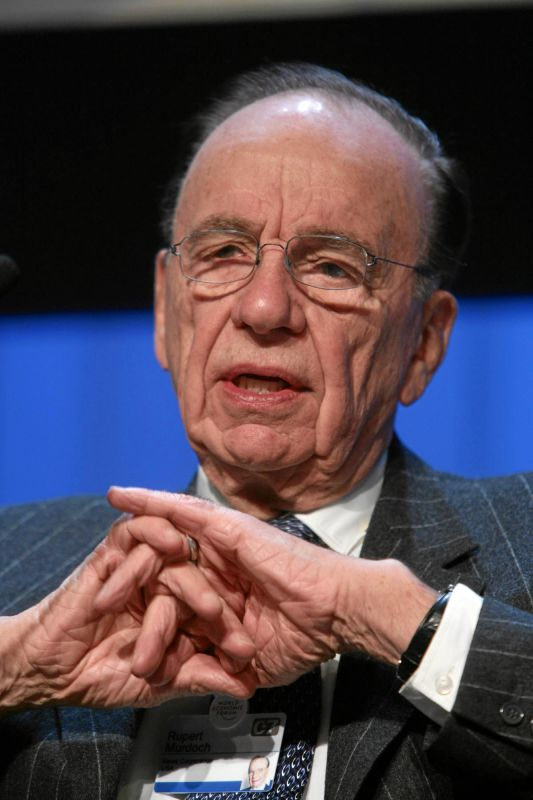
Rupert Murdoch, the owner of The Sunday Times, in 2007

Stern (German for "Star"), a German weekly news magazine published in Hamburg, was formed by the journalist and businessman Henri Nannen in 1948 to offer scandal, gossip and human interest stories. It was, according to the German media experts Frank Esser and Uwe Hartung, known for its investigative journalism and was politically left-of-centre. In 1981 Nannen resigned from his position of editor of the magazine, and moved to take the role of "publisher". In his place Stern had three editors: Peter Koch, Rolf Gillhausen and Felix Schmidt, who were aided by others including the journal's head of contemporary history, Thomas Walde. Manfred Fischer was CEO of Gruner + Jahr until 1981 when he was promoted to the board of Bertelsmann, their parent company; he was replaced by Gerd Schulte-Hillen. Wilfried Sorge was one of the Gruner + Jahr managers responsible for international sales.

The Sunday Times is a British national broadsheet newspaper, the Sunday sister paper of The Times. In 1968, under the ownership of Lord Thomson, The Sunday Times had been involved in a deal to purchase the Mussolini diaries for an agreed final purchase price of £250,000, although they had only paid out an initial amount of £60,000. (Note: £60,000 in 1968 is approximately £1,480,000 in 2025, according to calculations based on the Consumer Price Index measure of inflation.) These turned out to be forgeries undertaken by an Italian mother and daughter, Amalia and Rosa Panvini. In 1981 Rupert Murdoch, who owned several other papers in Australia, New Zealand and the UK, purchased Times Newspapers Ltd, which owned both The Times and its Sunday sister. Murdoch appointed Frank Giles to be the editor of The Sunday Times. The historian Hugh Trevor-Roper became an independent national director of The Times in 1974. Trevor-Roper—who was created Baron Dacre of Glanton in 1979—was a specialist on Nazi Germany, who had worked for the British Intelligence Services during and after the Second World War. At the war's end he had undertaken an official investigation of Hitler's death, interviewing eyewitnesses to the Führer's last movements. In addition to the official report he filed, Trevor-Roper also published The Last Days of Hitler (1947) on the subject. He subsequently wrote about the Nazis in Hitler's War Directives (1964) and Hitler's Place in History (1965).

Newsweek, an American weekly news magazine, was founded in 1933. In 1982 the journalist William Broyles was appointed editor-in-chief, while the editor was Maynard Parker; that year the company had circulation figures of three million readers.

== Production and sale of the diaries ==
=== Production ===
The initials FH (top row) which Kujau mistakenly used on the diary covers, instead of AH (bottom row). Both sets of initials are in Engravers Old English font.

It is unclear when Kujau produced his first Hitler diary. Stiefel says Kujau gave him a diary on loan in 1975. Schulze puts the date as 1976, while Kujau says he began in 1978, after a month's practice writing in the old German gothic script Hitler had used. Kujau used one of a pile of notebooks he had bought cheaply in East Berlin, and attempted to put the letters "AH" in gold on the front—purchasing plastic, Hong Kong-made letters from a department store, he inadvertently used "FH" rather than "AH". He took the black ribbon from a genuine SS document and attached it to the cover using a German army wax seal. For the ink, he bought two bottles of Pelikan ink—one black, one blue—and mixed them with water so it would flow more easily from the cheap modern pen he used. Finally he sprinkled tea over the pages and bashed the diaries against his desk to give them an aged look. Kujau showed the first volume to Stiefel, who was impressed and thought it a genuine Hitler diary; Stiefel wanted to buy it, but when the forger refused, the pair agreed that the collector could have it on loan.

In June 1979 Stiefel asked a former Nazi Party archivist, August Priesack, to verify the authenticity of the diary, which he subsequently did. (Note: The previous year Priesack had "authenticated" Stiefel's primary archive, failing to uncover numerous Kujau forgeries.) Priesack showed the diary to Eberhard Jäckel of the University of Stuttgart, who also thought the diary to be genuine, and wanted to edit it for publication. News of the diary's existence soon began to filter through to collectors of Hitler memorabilia. At the end of 1979 Tiefenthaeler contacted Heidemann to say that Stiefel had shown him around his collection, which included a Hitler diary—the only one Kujau had forged to that point. According to Hamilton "the discovery inflamed Heidemann almost to madness", and he aggressively pressed for what would be a journalistic scoop.

Stiefel showed Heidemann the diary in Stuttgart in January 1980, telling him it was from a plane crash in East Germany, although he refused to tell the journalist the name of his source. The collector spoke to Kujau to see if he would meet Heidemann, but the forger repeatedly refused Heidemann's requests for nearly a year. Heidemann returned to the Stern offices and spoke to his editor, but both Koch and Nannen refused to discuss the potential story with him, telling him to work on other features. The only person who was interested was Walde, who worked with Heidemann to find the source of the diaries. Their searches for Kujau proved fruitless, so they looked into the crash. Heidemann, who had read Baur's autobiography, knew of Gundlfinger's flight, and made a connection between Operation Seraglio and the diary; in November 1980 the two journalists travelled to Dresden and located the graves of the flight's crew.

In January 1981 Tiefenthaeler gave Kujau's telephone number to Heidemann, telling the journalist to ask for "Mr Fischer", one of Kujau's aliases. During the subsequent telephone call Kujau told Heidemann that there were 27 volumes of Hitler's diaries, the original manuscript of the unpublished third volume of Mein Kampf, an opera by the young Hitler called Wieland der Schmied (Wayland the Smith), (Note: Wieland der Schmied was a libretto drafted by Richard Wagner in 1849–50, based on the legend of Wieland the Smith from the Poetic Edda. Originally written for the Paris Opera, the project was abandoned by Wagner and not set to music.) numerous letters and unpublished papers, and several of Hitler's paintings—most of which were still in East Germany. Heidemann offered two million DMs for the entire collection and guaranteed secrecy until everything had been brought over the border. Although the pair did not agree to a deal, they agreed to "the foundations of a deal", according to Harris; Kujau's condition was that he would only deal directly with Heidemann, something that suited the journalist as a way of keeping other members of Stern away from the story.

Heidemann and Walde produced a prospectus for internal discussion, outlining what was available for purchase and the costs. The document, signed by Heidemann, finished with a veiled threat: "If our company thinks that the risk is too great, I suggest that I should seek out a publishing company in the United States which could put up the money and ensure that we get the German publication rights." The pair did not show the prospectus to anyone at Stern, but instead presented it to Gruner + Jahr's deputy managing director, Jan Hensmann, and Manfred Fischer; they also requested a 200,000 mark deposit from the publisher to secure the rights with Kujau. After a meeting that lasted a little over two hours, and with no recourse to an expert or historian, the deposit was authorised. As soon as the meeting ended, at about 7 pm, Heidemann travelled to Stuttgart, with the deposit money, to meet Kujau.

=== Acquisition ===
At that first meeting on 28 January 1981, which lasted over seven hours, Heidemann offered Kujau a deposit of only 100,000 DMs to agree the deal, which Kujau did not accept. At a second meeting the following day, the reporter revealed an additional lure he had brought with him: a uniform which he said was Göring's. Kujau tentatively agreed to provide the diaries and told Heidemann that he would call him as soon as he could arrange to receive them from East Germany. As a sign of good faith Heidemann lent the uniform to the forger, to show alongside his collection of other uniforms from the top Nazis; for his part, Kujau gave the journalist a painting purportedly by Hitler. Both the painting and uniform were fakes.

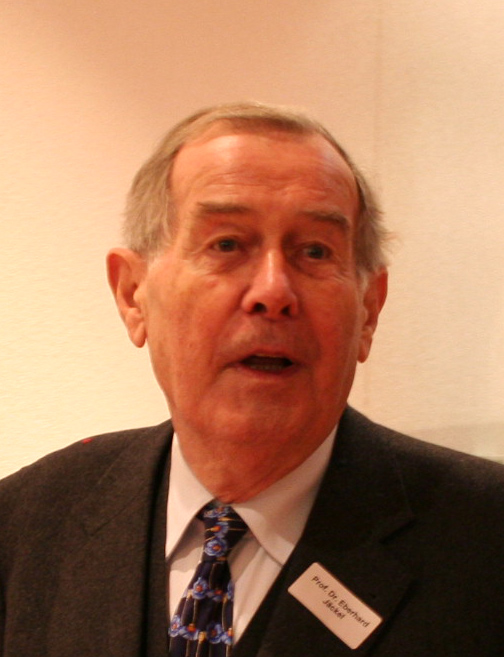
Eberhard Jäckel, the historian who initially thought that Hitler's poems and the diaries were genuine, but changed his mind

A week later Kujau met Jäckel and Alex Kuhn in connection with the poems he had forged and sold to Stiefel. These had been published by Jäckel and Kuhn in 1980, but one historian pointed out that one of the poems could not have been produced by Hitler as it had been written by the poet Herybert Menzel. Jäckel was concerned that the poem in question had been accompanied by a letter on Nazi party stationery guaranteeing it as a genuine work by Hitler. Many of the other pieces in Stiefel's collection were similarly verified, so doubts began to surface over these, too. Kujau claimed ignorance, saying he was only the middleman, but told them that Heidemann, a reputed journalist, had seen the crash site from which the papers originated; Jäckel advised Stiefel to have his collection forensically examined, and passed 26 suspect poems to the Hamburg district attorney for investigation. (Note: The Hamburg authorities looked into the problem and reported back in 1983, too late to stop the debacle at Stern.) Gruner + Jahr also knew about the problems with the poems, and that the source had been Kujau, but he assured them that this source had been elsewhere in East Germany, unconnected to the diaries, and they continued with their deal.

Ten days after the meeting with Jäckel and Kuhn, Kujau had prepared three further diaries. The contents were copied from a range of books, newspapers and magazines covering Hitler's life. Primary among them was the two-volume work by the historian Max Domarus, Hitler: Reden und Proklamationen, 1932–45 (Hitler: Speeches and Proclamations, 1932–45), which presents Hitler's day-to-day activities. Many of the diary's entries were lists of Nazi party promotions and official engagements. Although Kujau created some personal information about Hitler in the diaries, this was, in the opinion of both Harris and Hamilton, trivia. He began working to a schedule of producing three diaries a month. He later stated that he managed to produce one of the volumes in three hours; on a separate occasion he wrote three diaries in three days.

On 17 February 1981 Kujau flew to Stuttgart and gave Heidemann the three recently prepared diaries, (Note: Hamilton puts the delivery of the first diaries in mid-January.) for which Heidemann gave him 35,000 DMs. This was a great deal less than the 120,000 DMs – 40,000 DMs per diary – promised to Kujau in the first meeting, from which Heidemann would also claim a 10% commission; the reduction in funds was explained by a need to get an "expert opinion" on the authenticity of the diaries, and the balance was later paid. The following day the reporter delivered the diaries to Gruner + Jahr. In the subsequent meeting with Walde, Hensmann, Sorge and Fischer, Heidemann and Walde again insisted on secrecy about the project, to ensure their acquisition of all the diaries—it was agreed that not even the editors of Stern should be told of the discovery. More importantly, according to Harris, it was decided that they should not have the material examined by a forensic scientist or historian until every diary had been obtained. Fischer committed the company to the future purchases by immediately allocating one million DMs to the project. The company also set up a dedicated unit to deal with the diaries in an annex to the main Gruner + Jahr offices. It was headed by Walde, and consisted of an assistant, two secretaries and Heidemann. On receipt of the diaries they were photocopied and transcribed from the gothic script into modern German. Heidemann also entered into a private contract with Gruner + Jahr, which was kept secret from the company's legal and personnel departments. It contained a deal for him to publish books through the company at a generous royalty rate, and agreed that ten years after publication the original diaries would be given to Heidemann for research purposes, to be handed on to the West German government on his death. He was also to be given a bonus of 300,000 DMs for recovering the first eight diaries.

The explosion catastrophe in Reinsdorf is all I need. One ray of hope today was the dedication ceremony of the House of German Art in Munich.
But at any rate I can relax a bit with the architects. E [Eva Braun] now has two little puppies so time does not lie too heavily on her hands.
Must have a word with E. about Göring, too. His attitude towards her just isn't correct.

— Diary entry of 30 June 1935, created by Kujau.

The delivery of the diaries continued, although there were tensions between Heidemann and Kujau, partly owing to the journalist's "domineering personality and duplicity". Because of the nature of the transactions there were no receipts provided by Heidemann to Gruner + Jahr, and the business was conducted by the company on the basis of trust. By the end of February 1981, 680,000 DMs had been paid for the diaries, only around half of which was received by Kujau. Heidemann had pocketed the rest, defrauding both his employer and the forger in the process.

Despite the self-imposed restrictions of secrecy placed on the small circle inside Gruner + Jahr, Heidemann could not resist showing one of the volumes to Mohnke, as the entry referred to the SS Leibstandarte Adolf Hitler, Mohnke's former regiment. Heidemann read out three entries from the diaries—from 15, 17 and 18 March—which concerned visits made by Hitler to the regiment while in the Lichterfelde and Friesenstraße barracks. Mohnke informed him that the entries were inaccurate, saying that the Lichterfelde barracks were not occupied by the troops on that date, that the regimental name used in the diary was introduced much later, and that so far as he knew Hitler never visited the Friesenstraße barracks. Heidemann was unmoved by his friend's revelations, and posited that Hitler had probably written what he was planning to do, not what he had done. Harris suggests that this showed that the journalist "had long ceased operating on a rational wavelength about the diaries".

The circle of those at Gruner + Jahr who knew about the diaries grew in May 1981 when Fischer decided to look into the complicated copyright circumstances surrounding Hitler's property. (Note: Harris describes how "determining ownership of Hitler's estate was complex, indeed almost impossible". In 1948 the State of Bavaria had seized all Hitler's property, including 5 million DMs due as royalties on Mein Kampf, and declared his will invalid. In 1951 they seized personal objects bequeathed by the German leader to stop their sale, but had been unable to stop the publication of Tischgespräche im Führerhauptquartier (Hitler's Table Talk) because their rights only covered previously published material. Further complications arose from private deals made by individual members of the Hitler family.) He discussed the matter with the company's legal advisor, Andreas Ruppert, who advised speaking to Werner Maser, a historian who acted as a trustee on such matters to the Hitler family. Heidemann visited Maser in June 1981 and came to a deal that enabled the journalist and Stern, for a payment of 20,000 DMs, to retain "the rights to all the discovered or purchased documents or notes in the hand of Adolf Hitler ... which have so far not yet been published".

Quotes from the diaries

- "The English are driving me crazy—should I let them escape [from Dunkirk], or not? How is this Churchill reacting?"
- "This man Bormann has become indispensable to me. If I had had five Bormanns, I would not be sitting here now [in the Berlin bunker]."
- "[Himmler is] living in another world—an ancient Germanic fantasy world. I'm beginning to think he's out of his mind."
- "How on earth does Stalin manage it? Always imagined that he had no officers left, but he did the right thing [in purging the officer corps]. A new command structure in the Wehrmacht is what we need, too."

— Diary entries created by Kujau and prominently used by Newsweek

After twelve diaries had been delivered to Gruner + Jahr, Heidemann informed his employers that the price had risen from 85,000 DMs to 100,000 DMs per diary; the reason given by Heidemann was that the East German general smuggling the diaries was now having to bribe more people. The additional money was retained by Heidemann and not passed on to Kujau. The journalist was starting to lead a profligate lifestyle on his illicit profits, including two new cars (a BMW convertible and a Porsche, for a combined total of 58,000 DMs), renting two new flats on Hamburg's exclusive Elbchaussee and jewellery. He also spent considerable sums acquiring new Nazi memorabilia. Some were genuine, such as Wolff's SS honour dagger; others were purchased from Kujau, including 300 forged oil paintings, drawings and sketches Kujau claimed were by Hitler. Other items, carrying notes by Kujau attesting to their authenticity, included a gun described as that used by Hitler to commit suicide, and a flag identified as the Blutfahne ("Blood Flag"), carried in Hitler's failed Munich Beer Hall Putsch of 1923, and stained by the blood of Nazis shot by police.

The purchases of the diaries continued throughout mid to late 1981: Gruner + Jahr gave Heidemann 345,000 DMs on 29 July, and a further 220,000 DMs a week later, which brought the total up to 1.81 million DMs since the start of the year. This sum had purchased 18 diaries for the company. Schulte-Hillen, the new managing director, signed an authorisation for a further million DMs for future purchases. Just over two weeks later he signed a further authorisation for 600,000 DMs after Heidemann told him that the cost of the diaries had now risen to 200,000 DMs each; Heidemann also passed on the news that there were more than 27 diaries.

In mid-December 1982 the author and future Holocaust denier David Irving was also involved in tracking the existence of diaries written by Hitler. (Note: In 2000 Irving, a hunter of missing documents relating to Nazi history, sued the American historian Deborah Lipstadt and Penguin Books for libel, after Lipstadt published Denying the Holocaust, in which she called Irving a Holocaust denier. Finding for the defendants, the court found that Irving was an active Holocaust denier, anti-Semite and racist. In 2006 Irving was imprisoned in Austria for denying the Holocaust took place.) Priesack had previously told Irving of the existence of one of the diaries with a collector in Stuttgart. In a visit to Priesack to assess his collection of Nazi documents, Irving found out Stiefel's phone number, from which he worked out the address; he also obtained photocopies of some of the diary pages from Priesack. Irving visited Stiefel unannounced and tried to find out the name of the source, but the collector misled him as to the origin. Irving examined Priesack's photocopies and saw several problems, including spelling mistakes and the change in writing style between certain words. (Note: Stiefel retained his diary, and refused to sell it back to Kujau. In order to ensure he sold a full set of diaries to Heidemann, Kujau forged a second diary to cover the volume. Heidemann knew this was a second version, and still wanted the original. He offered 15,000 DMs for the diary, and Stiefel finally agreed to the sale, which ensured that Heidemann had two diaries for the period. Heidemann requested a new title for the front page—"Notes for the working team of the party". When he delivered the second volume to Stern's offices, he explained its existence by saying that Hitler occasionally wrote two volumes: one for himself and one for the party.)

== Initial testing and verification; steps towards publication ==
In April 1982 Walde and Heidemann contacted Josef Henke and Klaus Oldenhage of the Bundesarchiv (German Federal Archives) and Max Frei-Sulzer, the former head of the forensic department of the Zürich police, for assistance in authenticating the diaries. They did not specifically mention the diaries, but referred generally to new material. They also did not give the forensic specialists an entire diary, but removed one page only. For comparison purposes they also provided the experts with other samples of Hitler's writing, a handwritten draft for a telegram: this was from Heidemann's own collection and had also been forged by Kujau. Within days Walde provided further documents for comparison—all Kujau forgeries. Walde then flew to the US and commissioned Ordway Hilton, another forensic expert. (Note: Hilton, a former forensic worker at the New York City Police Department, was a member of the American Board of Forensic Document Examiners, the American Society of Questioned Document Examiners and the American Academy of Forensic Sciences.) None of those involved were experts in examining Nazi documents, and Hilton could not read German. Stern's management were too bound up in a secretive approach to be open about their source, or to provide the experts with a complete diary, which would have led to a more thorough examination of wider material. From the samples provided, the experts concluded that the handwriting was genuine. Hilton subsequently reported that "there was just no question" that both documents he had were written by the same person, whom he assumed to be Hitler.

The purchase of the diaries continued, and by June 1982 Gruner + Jahr possessed 35 volumes. In early 1983 the company took the decision to work towards a publication date for the diaries. To ensure wide readership and to maximise their returns, Stern issued a prospectus to potentially interested parties, Newsweek, Time, Paris Match and a syndicate of papers owned by Murdoch. Stern rented a large vault in a Swiss bank. They filled the space with Nazi memorabilia and displayed various letters and manuscripts.

The first historian to examine the diaries was Hugh Trevor-Roper, who was cautious, but impressed with the volume of documentation in front of him. As the background to the acquisition was explained to him he became less doubtful; he was falsely informed that the paper had been chemically tested and been shown to be pre-war, and he was told that Stern knew the identity of the Wehrmacht officer who had rescued the documents from the plane and had stored them ever since. By the end of the meeting he was convinced that the diaries were genuine, and later said "who, I asked myself, would forge sixty volumes when six would have served his purpose?" In an article in The Times on 23 April 1983 he wrote:

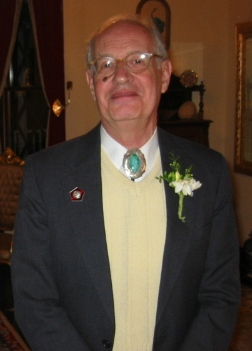
Gerhard Weinberg, who considered the diaries genuine when verifying them for Newsweek, and then changed his mind

I am now satisfied that the documents are authentic; that the history of their wanderings since 1945 is true; and that the standard accounts of Hitler's writing habits, of his personality, and even, perhaps, of some public events may, in consequence, have to be revised.

The day after Trevor-Roper gave his opinion of authenticity, Rupert Murdoch and his negotiation team arrived in Zürich. A deal was provisionally agreed for $2.5 million for the US serialisation rights, with an additional $750,000 for British and Commonwealth rights. While the discussions between Murdoch and Sorge were taking place, the diaries were examined by Broyle and his Newsweek team. After lengthy negotiation Broyle was informed that the minimum price Stern would consider was $3 million; the Americans returned home, informing Hensmann that they would contact him by phone in two days. When Broyle contacted the Germans he offered the amount, subject to authentication by their chosen expert, Gerhard Weinberg. In 1952 Weinberg, a cautious and careful historian, had written the Guide to Captured German Documents, for use by the US military; the work is described by Hamilton as definitive in its scope of the subject. Weinberg travelled to Zürich and, like Trevor-Roper, was impressed and reassured by the range of items on show; he was also partly persuaded by Trevor-Roper's endorsement of the diaries' authenticity. Weinberg commented that "the notion of anyone forging hundreds, even thousands of pages of handwriting was hard to credit". He had some reservations over the material and said he "would feel more comfortable if a German expert on the Third Reich who has already made his reputation had been brought in to look at the material". He also stated that "There is still room—however unlikely—for suspecting that the whole thing is a hoax. An obvious motive would be money. Another would be an attempt to rehabilitate Hitler".

Newsweek verbally accepted Hensmann's offer and he in turn informed Murdoch, giving him the option to raise his bid. Murdoch was furious, having considered the handshake agreement in Zürich final. On 15 April 1983 Murdoch, with Mark Edmiston, the president of Newsweek, met Schulte-Hillen, who, unexpectedly and without explanation, went back on all the previous verbal—and therefore, to his mind, non-binding—agreements and told them the price was now $4.25 million. Murdoch and Edmiston refused to accede to the new price and both left. The managers of Stern, with no publishing partners, backtracked on their statements and came to a second deal with Murdoch, who drove the price down, paying $800,000 for the US rights, and $400,000 for the British and Australian rights. Further deals were done in France with Paris Match for $400,000; in Spain with Grupo Zeta for $150,000; in the Netherlands for $125,000; in Norway for $50,000; and in Italy with Panorama for $50,000. Newsweek did not enter into a deal and instead based their subsequent stories on the copies of the diaries they had seen during the negotiation period.

== Released to the news media; the Stern press conference ==
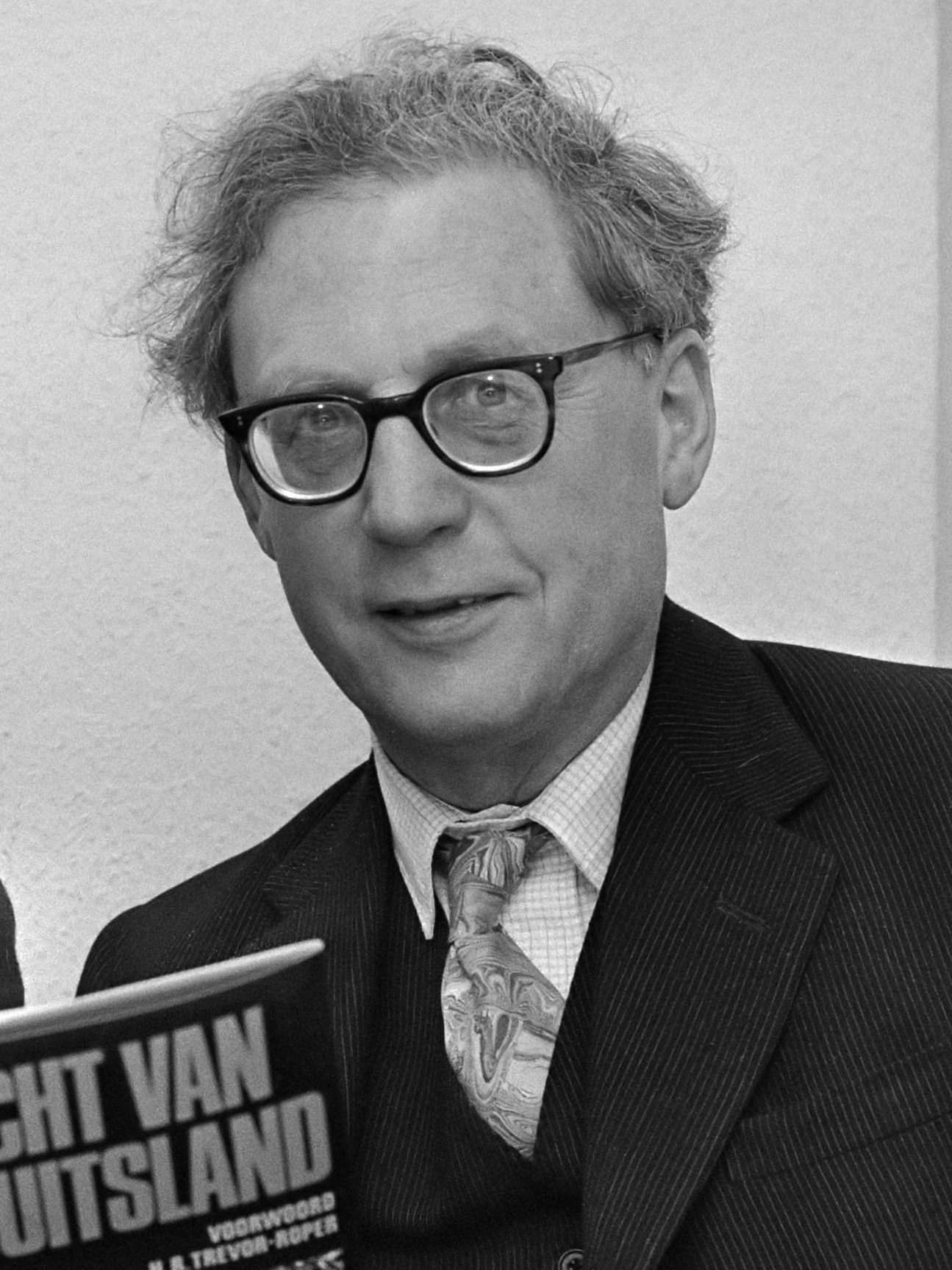
The British historian Hugh Trevor-Roper initially endorsed the diaries as genuine; his subsequent "180-degree turn" was not heeded by Murdoch.

On 22 April 1983 a press release from Stern announced the existence of the diaries and their forthcoming publication; a press conference was announced for 25 April. On hearing the news from Stern, Jäckel stated that he was "extremely sceptical" about the diaries, while his fellow historian, Karl Dietrich Bracher of the University of Bonn also thought their legitimacy unlikely. Irving was receiving calls from international news companies—the BBC, The Observer, Newsweek, Bild Zeitung—and he was informing them all that the diaries were fakes. The former German Chancellor, Helmut Schmidt, also said that he could not believe the diaries were genuine. The following day The Times published the news that their Sunday sister paper had the serialisation rights for the UK; the edition also carried an extensive piece by Trevor-Roper with his opinion on the authenticity and importance of the discovery. By this stage the historian had growing doubts over the diaries, which he passed on to the editor of The Times, Charles Douglas-Home. The Times editor presumed that Trevor-Roper would also contact Giles at The Sunday Times, while Trevor-Roper thought that Douglas-Home would do so; neither did. The Sunday paper thus remained oblivious to the growing concerns that the diaries might not be genuine.

On the evening of 23 April the presses began rolling for the following day's edition of The Sunday Times. After an evening meeting of the editorial staff, Giles phoned Trevor-Roper to ask him to write a piece rebutting the criticism of the diaries. He found that the historian had made "a 180-degree turn" regarding the diaries' authenticity, and was now far from sure that they were real. The paper's deputy editor, Brian MacArthur, rang Murdoch to see if they should stop the print run and re-write the affected pages. Murdoch's reply was "Fuck Dacre. Publish."

On the afternoon of 24 April, in Hamburg for the press conference the following day, Trevor-Roper asked Heidemann for the name of his source: the journalist refused, and gave a different story of how the diaries had been acquired. Trevor-Roper was suspicious and questioned the reporter closely for over an hour. Heidemann accused the historian of acting "exactly like an officer of the British army" in 1945. At a subsequent dinner the historian was evasive when asked by Stern executives what he was going to say at the announcement the following day.

At the press conference both Trevor-Roper and Weinberg expressed their doubts at the authenticity, and stated that German experts needed to examine the diaries to confirm whether the works were genuine. Trevor-Roper went on to say that his doubts sprung from the lack of proof that these books were the same ones as had been on the crashed plane in 1945. He finished his statement by saying that "I regret that the normal method of historical verification has been sacrificed to the perhaps necessary requirements of a journalistic scoop." The leading article in The Guardian described his public reversal as showing "moral courage". Irving, who had been described in the introductory statement by Koch as a historian "with no reputation to lose", stood at the microphone for questions, and asked how Hitler could have written his diary in the days following the 20 July plot, when his arm had been damaged. He denounced the diaries as forgeries, and held aloft the photocopied pages he had been given from Priesack. He asked if the ink in the diaries had been tested, but there was no response from the managers of Stern. Photographers and film crews jostled to get a better picture of Irving, and some punches were thrown by journalists while security guards moved in and forcibly removed Irving from the room, while he shouted "Ink! Ink!"

== Forensic analysis and the uncovering of the frauds ==
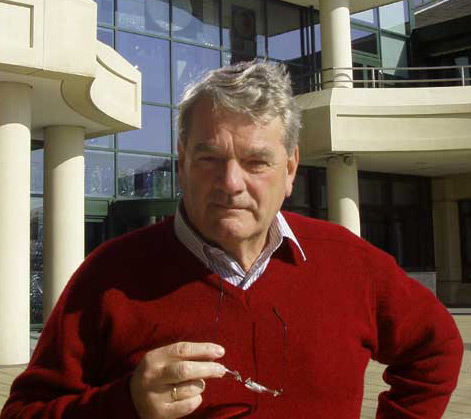
David Irving (2003 photograph), who had repeatedly condemned the diaries as forgeries, endorsed them as genuine after their public release.

With grave doubts now expressed about the authenticity of the diaries, Stern faced the possibility of legal action for disseminating Nazi propaganda. To ensure a definitive judgment on the diaries, Hagen, one of the company's lawyers, passed three complete diaries to Henke at the Bundesarchiv for a more complete forensic examination. While the debate on the diaries' authenticity continued, Stern published its special edition on 28 April, which provided Hitler's purported views on the flight of Hess to Scotland, Kristallnacht and the Holocaust. The following day Heidemann again met with Kujau, and bought the last four diaries from him.

On the following Sunday, 1 May 1983, The Sunday Times published further stories providing the background to the diaries, linking them more closely to the plane crash in 1945, and providing a profile of Heidemann. That day, when The Daily Express rang Irving for a further comment on the diaries, he informed them that he now believed the diaries to be genuine; The Times ran the story of Irving's U-turn the following day. Irving explained that Stern had shown him a diary from April 1945 in which the writing sloped downwards from left to right, and the script of which got smaller along the line. At a subsequent press conference Irving explained that he had been examining the diaries of Dr Theodor Morell, Hitler's personal doctor, in which Morell diagnosed the Führer as having Parkinson's disease, a symptom of which was to write in the way the text appeared in the diaries. Harris posits that further motives may also have played a part—the lack of reference to the Holocaust in the diaries may have been perceived by Irving as supporting evidence for his thesis, put forward in his book Hitler's War, that the Holocaust took place without Hitler's knowledge.

The same day Hagen visited the Bundesarchiv and was told of their findings: ultraviolet light had shown a fluorescent element to the paper, which should not have been present in an old document, and that the bindings of one of the diaries included polyester which had not been made before 1953. Research in the archives also showed errors. The findings were partial only, and not conclusive; more volumes were provided to aid the analysis.

Genuine Hitler signature (undated)

Kujau's version of Hitler's signature, which Kenneth W. Rendell described as a "terrible rendition"

When Hagen reported back to the Stern management, an emergency meeting was called and Schulte-Hillen demanded the identity of Heidemann's source. The journalist relented, and provided the provenance of the diaries as Kujau had given it to him. Harris describes how a bunker mentality descended on the Stern management as, instead of accepting the truth of the Bundesarchiv's findings, they searched for alternative explanations as to how post-war whitening agents could have been used in the wartime paper. The paper then released a statement defending their position which Harris judges was "resonant with hollow bravado".

While Koch was touring the US, giving interviews to most of the major news channels, he met Kenneth W. Rendell, a handwriting expert in the studios of CBS, and showed him one of the volumes. Rendell's first impression was that the diaries were forged. He later reported that "everything looked wrong", including new-looking ink, poor quality paper and signatures that were "terrible renditions" of Hitler's. Rendell concludes the diaries were not particularly good fakes, calling them "bad forgeries but a great hoax". He states that "with the exception of imitating Hitler's habit of slanting his writing diagonally as he wrote across the page, the forger failed to observe or to imitate the most fundamental characteristics of his handwriting."

On 4 May fifteen volumes of the diaries were removed from the Swiss bank vault and distributed to various forensic scientists: four went to the Bundesarchiv and eleven went to the Swiss specialists in St Gallen. The initial results were ready on 6 May, which confirmed what the forensic experts had been telling the management of Stern for the last week: the diaries were poor forgeries, with modern components and ink that was not in common use in wartime Germany. Measurements had been taken of the evaporation of chloride in the ink which showed the diaries had been written within the previous two years. There were also factual errors, including some from Domarus's Hitler: Reden und Proklamationen, 1932–45 that Kujau had copied. Before passing the news to Stern, the Bundesarchiv had already informed the government, saying it was "a ministerial matter". The managers at Stern tried to release the first press statement that acknowledged the forensic findings and stated that the diaries were forged, but the official government announcement was released five minutes before Stern's.

== Arrests and trial ==
Once the government announcement appeared on television, Kujau took his wife and mistress to Austria; he introduced the latter to Edith as his cleaner. After he saw a news report a few days later, naming him as the forger, and also hearing that Stern had paid nine million DMs, he first phoned his lawyer and then the Hamburg State prosecutor, before agreeing to hand himself in at the border between Austria and West Germany the following day. When police raided his house, they found several notebooks identical to those used in the fraud. Kujau continued to use a variation of the story he had told Heidemann—that of obtaining the diaries from the East—but he was bitter that the journalist was still at liberty, and had withheld so much of Stern's money from him. After thirteen days, on 26 May, he wrote a full confession, stating that Heidemann knew all along that the diaries were forgeries. Heidemann was arrested that evening.

Following a police investigation that lasted over a year, on 21 August 1984 the trial against Heidemann and Kujau opened in Hamburg. Both men were charged with defrauding Stern of 9.3 million DMs. (Note: At the time the case went to court, 9.3 million DMs equated to £2.33 million or $3.7 million. £2.33 million in 1984 is equivalent to £7,589,000 in 2025, according to calculations based on the Consumer Price Index measure of inflation.) Despite the seriousness of the charges facing the two men, Hamilton considers that "it also appeared clear that the trial was going to be a farce, a real slapstick affair that would enrage the judge and amuse the entire world." The proceedings lasted until July 1985, when both men were sent to prison: four years and eight months for Heidemann, four years and six months for Kujau. In September one of the supporting magistrates overseeing the case was replaced after he fell asleep; three days later the court were "amused" to see pictures of Idi Amin's underpants, which Heidemann had framed on his wall. At times the case "denigrated into a slanging match" between Kujau and Heidemann. In his summing up Judge Hans-Ulrich Schroeder said that "the negligence of Stern has persuaded me to soften the sentences against the two main co-conspirators." Heidemann was found guilty of stealing 1.7 million DMs from Stern, and Kujau was found guilty of receiving 1.5 million DMs for his role in the forgeries. Despite the lengthy investigation and trial, at least five million DMs remained unaccounted for.

== Aftermath ==
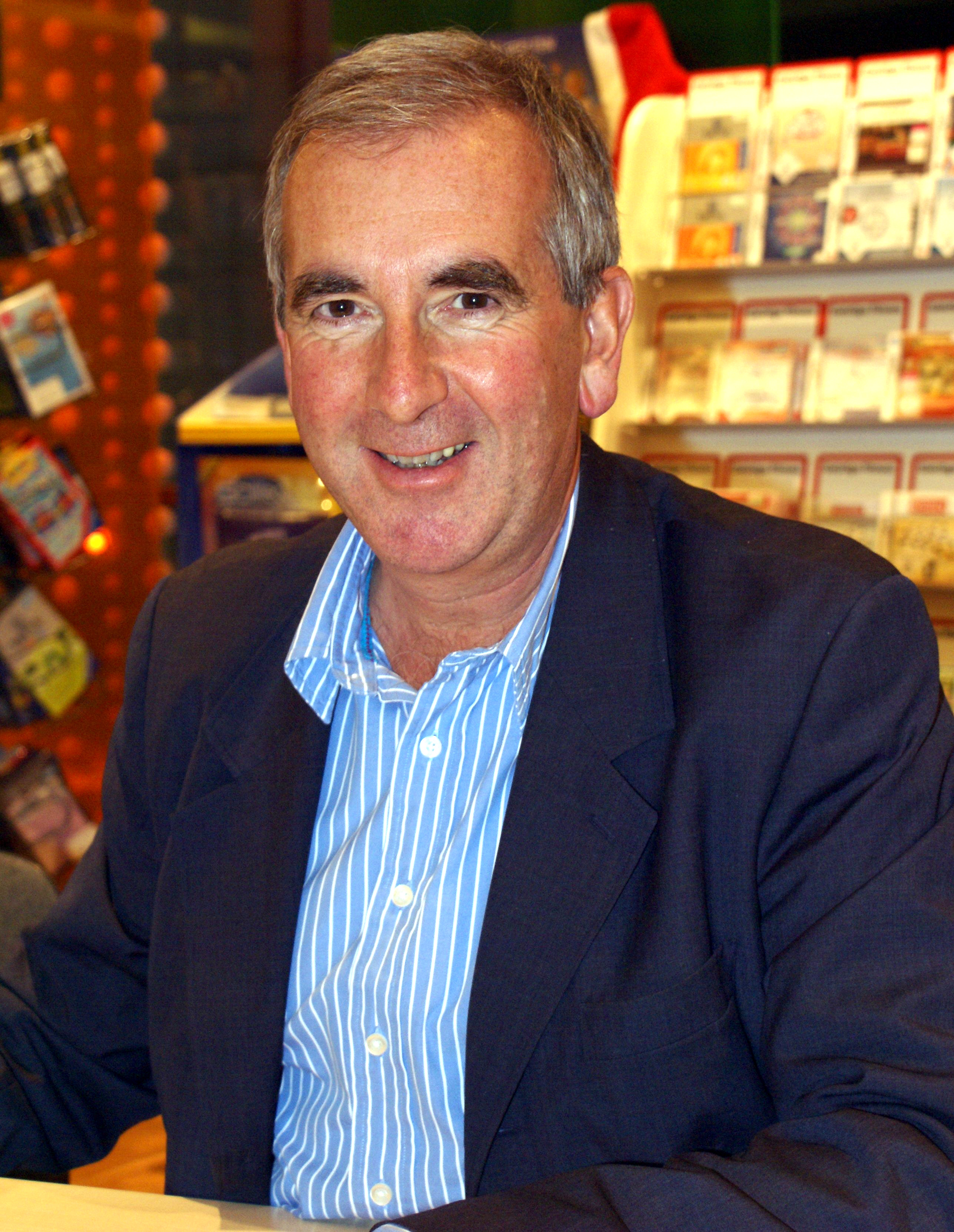
The writer Robert Harris, who published an account of the hoax in 1986

When Kujau was released from prison in 1987 he was suffering from throat cancer. He opened a gallery in Stuttgart and sold "forgeries" of Salvador Dalí and Joan Miró, all signed with his own name. Although he prospered, Kujau was later arrested for forging driving licences; he was fined the equivalent of £2,000. He died of cancer in Stuttgart in September 2000.

Heidemann was also released from prison in 1987. Five years later it was reported in the German newspaper Der Spiegel that in the 1950s he had been recruited by the Stasi, the East German secret police, to monitor the arrival of American nuclear weapons into West Germany. In 2008 he had debts exceeding €700,000, and was living on social security; his situation had not changed by 2013, and he remained bitter about his treatment. He died in Hamburg in December 2024.

Two of Stern's editors, Koch and Schmidt, lost their jobs because of the scandal. Both complained strongly when told that their resignations were expected, pointing out that they had both wanted to sack Heidemann in 1981. A settlement of 3.5 million DMs was provided to each of them as part of the severance package. The staff at the magazine were angry at the approach taken by their managers, and held sit-ins to protest at the "management's bypassing traditional editorial channels and safeguards". The scandal caused a major crisis for Stern and, according to Esser and Hartung, the magazine "once known for its investigative reporting, became a prime example of sensation-seeking checkbook journalism". Stern's credibility was severely damaged and it took the magazine ten years to regain its pre-scandal status and reputation. According to the German Historical Institute, the scandal was also "instrumental in discrediting the tendency toward an 'unprejudiced' and euphemistic assessment of the Third Reich in West German popular culture".

At The Sunday Times, Murdoch moved Giles to the new position of "editor emeritus". When Giles asked what the title meant, Murdoch informed him that "It's Latin, Frank; the e means you're out and the meritus means you deserved it." Murdoch later said that "circulation went up and it stayed up. We didn't lose money or anything like that", referring to the 20,000 new readers the paper retained after the scandal broke, and the fact that Stern returned all the money paid to it by the Sunday Times. In April 2012, during the Leveson Inquiry, he acknowledged his role in publishing the diaries, and took the blame for making the decision, saying "It was a massive mistake I made and I will have to live with it for the rest of my life." Trevor-Roper died in 2003. Despite a long and respected career as a historian, according to Richard Davenport-Hines, his biographer, Trevor-Roper's role in the scandal left his reputation "permanently besmirched". (Note: At the time a limerick was circulating around Cambridge: There once was a fellow named Dacre, Who was God in his own little acre, But in the matter of diaries, He was quite ultra vires, And unable to spot an old faker.) In January 1984 Broyles resigned as editor of Newsweek, to "pursue new entrepreneurial ventures".

In 1986 the journalist Robert Harris published an account of the hoax, Selling Hitler: The Story of the Hitler Diaries. Five years later Selling Hitler, a five-episode drama-documentary series based on Harris's book, was broadcast on the British ITV channel. It starred Jonathan Pryce as Heidemann, Alexei Sayle as Kujau, Tom Baker as Fischer, Alan Bennett as Trevor-Roper, Roger Lloyd-Pack as Irving, Richard Wilson as Nannen and Barry Humphries as Murdoch. Later that year Charles Hamilton published the second book to investigate the forgeries: The Hitler Diaries. In 1992 the story of the diaries was adapted to the big screen by Helmut Dietl, in his satirical German-language film Schtonk! The film, which starred Götz George as Heidemann and Uwe Ochsenknecht as Kujau, won three Deutscher Filmpreis awards, and nominations for a Golden Globe and an Academy Award.

In 2004 one of the diaries was sold at auction for €6,400 to an unknown buyer. Stern announced in 2013 that they would hand over the remainder to the Bundesarchiv but the transfer never took place. One of the Sunday Times journalists involved in the story, Brian MacArthur, later explained why so many experienced journalists and businessmen "were so gullible" about the authenticity of the diaries:

... the discovery of the Hitler diaries offered so tempting a scoop that we all wanted to believe they were genuine. Once hoist with a deal, moreover, we had to go on believing in their authenticity until they were convincingly demonstrated as forgeries. ... The few of us who were in on the secret fed in the adrenalin: we were going to write the most stunning scoop of our careers.

In March 2023 all 62 volumes of the forged diaries were published in hard copy by the German publisher März Verlag and for free viewing on the website of Norddeutscher Rundfunk. In April the publishing house Bertelsmann, which owns the diaries, said it would give them to the German state for preservation. The Leibniz Institute for Contemporary History has been tasked with investigating the diaries' reception and why they were taken so seriously. As part of the investigation, it will examine Nannen, who died in 1996 and is now known to have had more involvement in Nazism than previously thought. The diaries will be put on public display at the German Federal Archives.

== See also ==
- Conversations with Hitler, a book by Hermann Rauschning

== Notes and references ==
=== Sources ===
- Baur, Hans (1958). Hitler's Pilot. Translated by Edward Fitzgerald. London: Frederick Muller. OCLC 774436927.
- Blanchard, Margaret A. (2013). History of the Mass Media in the United States: An Encyclopedia. New York: Routledge. ISBN 978-1-135-91742-5.
- Davenport-Hines, Richard (2004). "Roper, Hugh Redwald Trevor-, Baron Dacre of Glanton". Oxford Dictionary of National Biography (online ed.). Oxford University Press. doi:10.1093/ref:odnb/88756. (Subscription, Wikipedia Library access or UK public library membership required.)
- Esser, Frank; Hartung, Uwe (April 2004). "Nazis, Pollution, and no Sex: Political Scandals as a Reflection of Political Culture in Germany". American Behavioral Scientist. 47 (8). Thousand Oaks, CA: Sage Publications: 177–192. doi:10.1177/0002764203262277. S2CID 143578000.
- Evans, Colin (1998). The Casebook of Forensic Detection. London: John Wiley & Sons. ISBN 978-0-471-28369-0.
- Gutman, Robert (1971). Richard Wagner: The Man, his Mind and his Music. Harmondsworth: Penguin Books. ISBN 978-0-14-021168-9.
- Hamilton, Charles (1991). The Hitler Diaries. Lexington: The University Press of Kentucky. ISBN 978-0-8131-1739-3.
- Harless, James D. (1985). Mass Communication: An Introductory Survey. Dubuque, IA: W.C. Brown Publishers. ISBN 978-0-697-00124-5.
- Harris, Robert (1991) [1986]. Selling Hitler. London: Faber and Faber. ISBN 978-0-571-14726-7.
- Rendell, Kenneth W. (1994). Forging History: The Detection of Fake Letters and Documents. Norman: University of Oklahoma Press. ISBN 978-0-8061-2636-4.
- Rentschler, Eric (Autumn 2003). "The Fascination of a Fake: The Hitler Diaries". New German Critique (90). Durham, NC: Duke University Press: 177–92. doi:10.2307/3211115. JSTOR 3211115.
- Tuccille, Jerome (1989). Rupert Murdoch: Creator of a Worldwide Media Empire. Washington, DC: Beard Books. ISBN 978-1-58798-224-8.
- Williams, Robert C. (2015). The Forensic Historian: Using Science to Reexamine the Past. Abingdon, Oxon: Routledge. ISBN 978-1-317-45680-3.
