= Carin II =

Luxury yacht

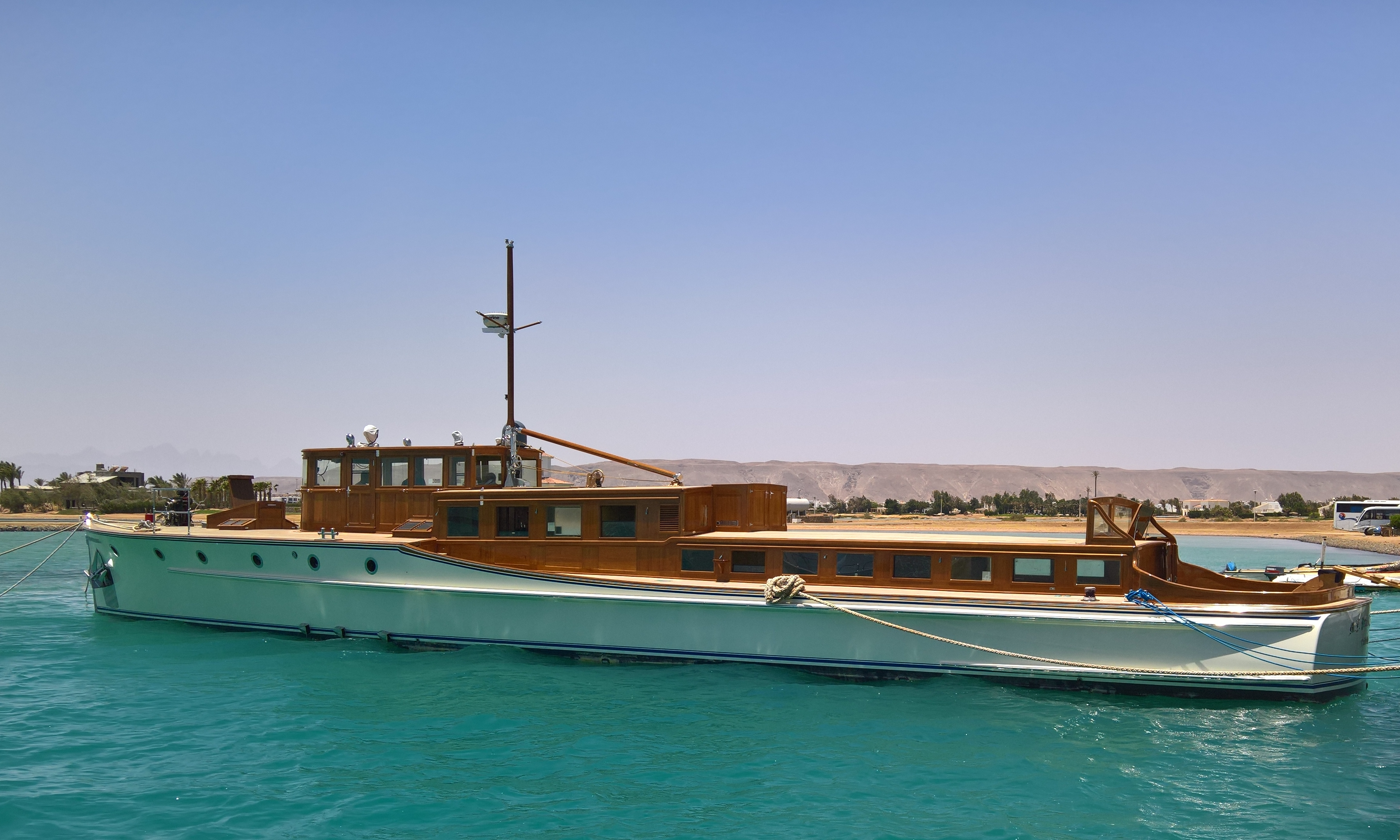
- The former Carin II as MY Prince Charles (2017)

[[|]]Germany, United Kingdom, Malta
- Name: ex HMS Prince Albert, ex Theresia, ex Carin II, ex Prince Charles
- Owner: Hermann Goering, British government, Emmy Goering, Gerd Heidemann, Mustafa Karim, Sandra Simpson, and others
- Builder: Heidtmann, Hamburg
- Yard number: 5730
- Laid down: 1936
- Completed: June 27,1937
- In service: private yacht
- Identification: IMO number: ?; MMSI number: 215000499; Callsign:9HB4963

General characteristics
- Class & type: Motor yacht
- Tonnage: 71.12 GT
- Length: 27.5 m (90 ft)
- Beam: 4.85 m (15.9 ft)
- Draught: 1.28 m (4.2 ft)
- Propulsion: 3x diesel engines
- Speed: 14 knots (26 km/h) (maximum)
- Crew: 4 (basic)

Carin II is the first name of a luxury motor yacht that was built in Hamburg in 1936/37 and gifted to Hermann Goering. At the end of World War II, it was seized by the British Army and later given to Princess Elizabeth. Since 1960, the ship had a number of private owners. Reflecting the checkered history are the later names of Carin II - HSM Royal Albert, Prince Charles, Theresia, again Carin II, and finally MY Prince Charles.

== Construction ==
Designed by Karl Schulte, the ship was custom-built by the Heidtmann Shipyard in Hamburg in 1936-37. With a weight of 71.12 GT, it is 27,5 metres (90 feet) long, 4.85 metres (16 feet) wide, and has a draft of 1.28 metres (4 feet). The double hull is made of wood using Teak outside and Oak inside. With 3 propellers and powered by 3 diesel engines, the ship could reach a speed of 14 knots. At a cost of 750,000 Reichsmark (or 1.3 million RM), it was a gift of the German Association of the Automotive Industry. This organization had already given Goering a smaller yacht in 1935, named Carin after Goering's deceased first wife. Carin II was launched in the presence of his second wife in Hamburg on June 27, 1937.

== History ==
=== 1937 - 1945 ===
In the years prior to World War II, Goering used the yacht extensively cruising on German rivers and canals, as well as on trips on the North Sea and the Baltic Sea. The four-men crew was complemented by personnel of the Luftwaffe. The ship was used for recreation - Goering had a hunting seat on the foredeck - as well as for representation and conferences. Visitors included Mussolini, Miklós Horthy, and Hitler, Himmler, Ribbentrop, and other Nazi leaders. During the war, the yacht was moved from Werbellinsee to Berlin Gatow. Shortly before the end of the war, Carin II was brought to Moelln near Lubeck.

=== 1945 - 1960 ===
By early May 1945, the British Army had reached Moelln and seized the vessel. It was then brought to Kiel with General Montgomery on board. By the end of 1945, the vessel was relocated to Hamburg and renamed HMS Royal Albert. In 1952, Montgomery gifted the ship to Princess Elizabeth, who renamed it after her first son Prince Charles. In 1950, the ship was stationed in Krefeld-Uerdingen. As the flagship of the British Army of the Rhine, it was used by members of the royal house, including Prince Philip and Princess Margaret, for visits in Germany. Young Prince Charles peeled potatoes on the ship. The vessel participated in a British fleet visit with Prince Philip to Switzerland in 1954, and, one year later, it was the commando ship during the NATO maneuver Cordon bleu.

=== 1960 - present ===
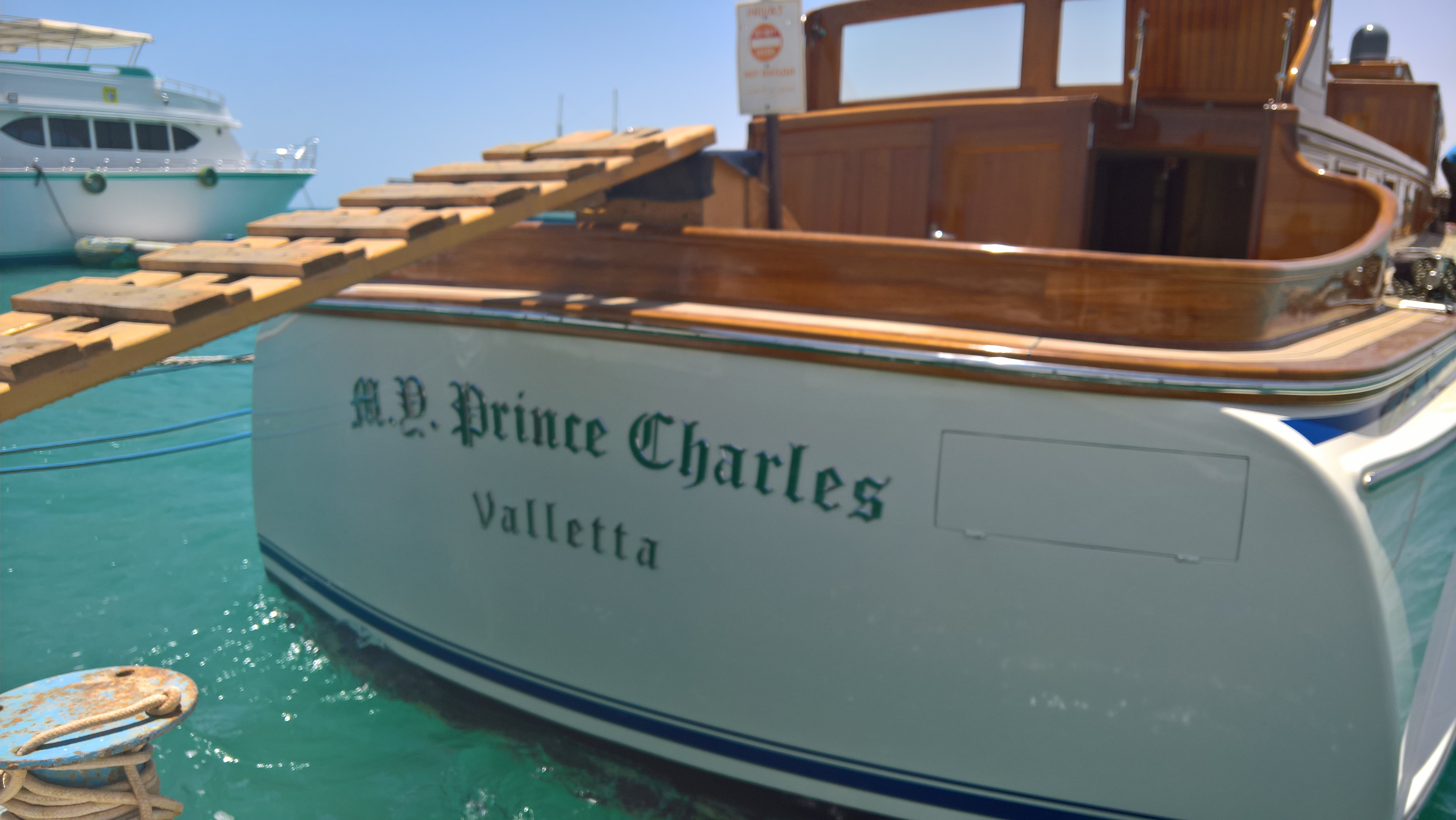
MY Prince Charles, El-Gouna, Egypt, 2017

As the ship was registered in her name, Emmy Goering requested the return of the ship as being part of her private property, and, in 1960, was successful in court. A few months later, she sold the ship for 33,000 DM to a German businessman who relocated it to Oberwinter (near Remagen) and renamed it after his wife, Theresia. In 1973, he sold the vessel to the journalist Gerd Heidemann for 160,000 DM. Heidemann brought the ship to Hamburg, renovated it, replaced the diesel engines, and named it again Carin II. In 1978, the vessel was offered unsuccessfully at an auction for 1.1 million DM. Heidemann got into legal and financial trouble after his publication of the falsified Hitler Diaries and sold the vessel to the Egyptian-born businessman Mustafa Karim for 270,000 DM in December 1985. Karim changed the name to MY Prince Charles. In February 1987, while sailing in the Mediterranean, Karim and his American wife Sandra Simpson got into bad weather and had to take shelter in Benghazi. There, the boat was confiscated and the couple separately detained for months. Eventually, the boat was released and brought first to Hurghada, and then to El-Gouna, Egypt at the Red Sea for restoration. After Karim's death in 1993, his wife had a long and protracted legal battle to gain ownership of the vessel. During this time, the boat sat idle and deteriorated. Also, Goering-related memorabilia were stolen from the ship as well as from Simpson's apartment and offered for sale as The Carin Archive. By 2004, Sampson had ownership of MY Prince Charles and offered it for sale. Six years later a buyer had not yet been found and the vessel was still in El-Gouna. The vessel was eventually sold.

The names of later owners are not publicly known. As of 2026, the MY Prince Charles is seaworthy; its home port is Valetta.

== In movies ==
Reconstructions of the Carin II were used in the 1991 movie Schtonk and the British miniseries Selling Hitler.
