= Max Domarus =

German historian (1911–1992)

Maximilian Bernhard Domarus (1911–1992) was a German writer, historian, researcher, archivist, translator, and publicist.

Domarus is best known for his historical work on the Third Reich and the speeches of Adolf Hitler. Domarus was the author and editor of the 3,400-page four-volume set entitled Hitler: Speeches and Proclamations 1932–1945: The Chronicle of a Dictatorship.

Domarus' work is generally considered the most essential and reliable resource on the speeches of Hitler and a unique chronicle of the Third Reich. However, there were also some chronological and factual errors in the original first Edition: these errors helped expose Konrad Kujau's forged Hitler Diaries, which copied from the original first edition as its main source, since Kujau copied these errors into the Diaries.

== Bibliography ==
- Domarus, M. (1990). Hitler: Speeches and Proclamations 1932 – 1934. The Chronicle of a Dictatorship. V1. ISBN 0-86516-227-1
- Domarus, M. (1992). Hitler: Speeches and Proclamations 1935 – 1938. The Chronicle of a Dictatorship. V2. ISBN 0-86516-229-8
- Domarus, M. (1996). Hitler: Speeches and Proclamations 1939 – 1940. The Chronicle of a Dictatorship. V3. ISBN 0-86516-230-1
- Domarus, M. (2004). Hitler: Speeches and Proclamations 1941 – 1945. The Chronicle of a Dictatorship. V4. ISBN 0-86516-231-X

== See also ==
- Hitler: Speeches and Proclamations
- List of Adolf Hitler speeches
- List of Adolf Hitler books
