= Selling Hitler =

Television series

- DVD cover (2010)
- Genre: Drama-documentary miniseries
- Based on: Selling Hitler: The Story of the Hitler Diaries by Robert Harris
- Written by: Howard Schuman
- Directed by: Alastair Reid
- Starring: Jonathan Pryce; Alexei Sayle; Tom Baker; Alan Bennett; Roger Lloyd-Pack; Richard Wilson
- Composers: John E. Keane; Tim Souster
- Country of origin: United Kingdom
- Original language: English
- No. of series: 1
- No. of episodes: 5

Production
- Executive producers: Lavinia Warner; John Hambley
- Producer: Andrew Brown
- Production company: Euston Films for Thames Television in association with Warner Sisters Productions

Original release
- Network: ITV
- Release: 11 June – 9 July 1991

Selling Hitler is a 1991 ITV television comedy-drama mini-series about the Hitler Diaries hoax and was based on Robert Harris's 1986 book Selling Hitler: The Story of the Hitler Diaries.

The screenplay was written by Howard Schuman.

== Plot ==
In 1981, Gerd Heidemann (Jonathan Pryce), a war correspondent and reporter with the German magazine Stern, makes what he believes is the literary and historical scoop of the century: the diary of Adolf Hitler.

Over the next two years, Heidemann and the senior management figures at Stern secretly pay DM 9.3 million to a mysterious "Dr Fischer" (Alexei Sayle) for the sixty volumes of Hitler's diaries, covering the period from 1932 to 1945, plus a special volume about the flight of Rudolf Hess to the United Kingdom. Some of the money is made as payment to "Dr Fischer", but the larger proportion goes into Heidemann's pocket to finance his extravagant lifestyle and collection of World War II memorabilia, including the yacht of Hermann Göring.

To the dismay of all, including eminent historians such as Hugh Trevor-Roper (Alan Bennett), who had verified the diaries as authentic, it is discovered after the publication of the first extract that the diaries are crude forgeries by Stuttgart criminal Konrad Kujau.

== Cast ==
The five-part series was directed by Alastair Reid and starred:

- Jonathan Pryce as Gerd Heidemann
- Alexei Sayle as Konrad Kujau (aka "Dr Fischer")
- Tom Baker as Manfred Fischer, CEO of Gruner + Jahr
- Alan Bennett as Hugh Trevor-Roper (Lord Dacre of Glanton)
- Roger Lloyd-Pack as David Irving
- Richard Wilson as Henri Nannen
- Alison Doody as Gina Heidemann
- Julie T. Wallace as Edith Lieblang
- Peter Capaldi as Thomas Walde
- Elaine Collins as Maria Modritsch
- John Shrapnel as Gerd Schulte-Hillen
- Alison Steadman as Edda Göring
- Philip Fox as Leo Pesch
- John Boswall as August Priesack
- John Paul as Karl Wolff
- Barry Humphries as Rupert Murdoch
- Devon Scott as Barbara Dickmann
- Bob Goody as Nazi rally Chairman
- Robert Longden as Dr. Louis Werner
- Mary Ellen Ray as Lynn Nesbit
- Elizabeth Spender as Marlene

The series, which The Guardian described as "a rollicking comedy with black edges", was released on Region 1 DVD in July 2010.

== See also ==
- Schtonk!, 1992 German comedy film about the same subject matter
