= Union of Writers =

Union of Writers may refer to:

- USSR Union of Writers formed in 1932
- Union of Russian Writers, a non-governmental organization formed in 1991
- Moldovan Writers' Union
- Nazi Writers Union
- L'Union des Ecrivains formed in France in 1968
  - Members included:
    - Françoise Mallet-Joris (1930–2016)
    - Alain Jouffroy (1928–2015)
    - Jean-Paul Sartre (1905–1980)
    - Eugène Guillevic (1907–1997)
    - Michel Butor (1926–2016)
