= Schtonk! =

- DVD cover
- Directed by: Helmut Dietl
- Written by: Helmut Dietl; Ulrich Limmer
- Starring: Götz George; Uwe Ochsenknecht; Christiane Hörbiger
- Release date: 1992
- Running time: 115 minutes
- Country: Germany
- Language: German
- Box office: 1.9 million admissions (Germany)

Schtonk! (subtitled Der Film zum Buch vom Führer; "The film accompanying the Führer's book") is a 1992 German satirical film which retells the story of the 1983 Hitler Diaries hoax. It was written and directed by Helmut Dietl.

== Background ==
In 1983, the German magazine Stern began to publish the purported Hitler diaries with great fanfare. They were soon proven to be fake using basic forensic techniques.

Co-writer and director Helmut Dietl researched the scandal for two years and was quoted as having to leave out several real events from the film because they were too outrageous. The title is a bow to Charlie Chaplin's classic The Great Dictator, in which the Tomainian dictator Adenoid Hynkel repeatedly uses "Schtonk!" as an expression of disgust; the word has no meaning in German.

== Plot ==
Fritz Knobel (a fictionalized version of real-life forger Konrad Kujau) supports himself by faking and selling Nazi memorabilia. He sells a portrait of Eva Braun and one volume of what he alleges to be Hitler's diaries (but which he actually wrote himself) to factory owner Karl Lenz. Lenz shows off the diary to his guests during a "birthday party for the Führer", among whom is sleazy journalist Hermann Willié. Willié works for the magazine "HH Press"; the letters HH are a licence plate abbreviation for Hamburg where the real-life Stern magazine is located, but are also the common abbreviation for "Heil Hitler" among neo-Nazis.

Knobel, in need of material to produce more diaries, turns to his own life for inspiration; after he meets Martha and she becomes his lover (he is already married to Biggi), Martha becomes the inspiration for the diary version of Eva Braun. Rumors about the diaries cause a major Nazi craze in high society, allowing former Nazi officials to flaunt their old ranks (e.g. Obergruppenführer). Willié becomes even more obsessed, buying Hermann Göring's old yacht Carin II and starting an affair with his (fictional) grandniece Freya von Hepp, who is based on Hermann Göring's daughter Edda Göring.

Towards the end, the plot has developed its own dynamics, putting more and more pressure on Knobel to deliver the remaining volumes while in constant fear that his forgery will be discovered. The volumes are convincing enough to fool the enthusiastic journalists, who are willing to overlook some oddities, especially a false monogram "FH" instead of "AH" on one of the volumes. They invent alternative facts to explain away the discrepancy (the term "Führerhauptquartier" instead of "Adolf Hitler" for instance). Later, Knobel manages to manipulate a forensic graphoanalysis to his advantage, but it seems only a matter of time until the truth is discovered.

The constant fear, and the struggle against developing a too-close identification with the person he is writing about, eventually make Knobel collapse. Biggi and Martha take charge of the situation, forcing him to pull himself out of the forgery business just in time, while (similar to the end of World War II) the Nazi-enthusiasts fall – more or less hard according to their personal level of belief.

== Cast ==
- Götz George – Hermann Willié (journalist; fictional equivalent of Gerd Heidemann)
- Uwe Ochsenknecht – Fritz Knobel (forger Konrad Kujau)
- Christiane Hörbiger – Freya von Hepp (Hermann Göring's grandniece, Willié's/Heidemann's noble girl friend)
- Dagmar Manzel – Biggi
- Veronica Ferres – Martha
- Ulrich Mühe – Dr. Wieland
- Harald Juhnke – Pit Kummer
- Hermann Lause – Kurt Glück
- Martin Benrath – Uwe Esser
- Rosemarie Fendel – Mrs. Lentz

== Reception ==
The film was a huge hit in Germany but performed badly in many other territories. It was the second highest grossing German film of the year with 1.9 million admissions, behind Otto: Der Liebesfilm.

== Awards ==
In 1992, Schtonk! won three awards at the German Film Awards in the categories "Outstanding Feature Film", "Outstanding Individual Achievement: Actor" (Götz George) and "Outstanding Individual Achievement: Direction" (Helmut Dietl), as well as the Best Screenplay Award at the Tokyo International Film Festival (Helmut Dietl, Ulrich Limmer).

In 1993, Harald Juhnke won the Ernst Lubitsch Award for his role as Pit Kummer.

Schtonk! was nominated for an Academy Award and a Golden Globe in the category of "Best Foreign Language Film" in 1993, losing to the French film Indochine in both cases.
