= Fleur Bremmer =

German actor (born 16 November 2014)

- Born: Fleur Bremmer; 16 November 2014 (age 11); Bad Wildungen, Germany
- Years active: 2023–present

Fleur Bremmer (born 16 November 2014 in Bad Wildungen) is a German–Dutch child actor. She is best known for her role as Edda Göring in the American feature film Nuremberg (2025), in which she starred alongside Russell Crowe and Rami Malek.

== Life ==
Fleur comes from a German–Netherlands family and because of her young age, her Dutch-born mother and former handball international (now coach) Tessa Bremmer-Cocx acts as her official contact and spokes person. Her father, dentist Dr. Christoph Bremmer, and a younger brother complete her family. Bremmer grew up in Hesse and lives in Kassel. She speaks fluent German, Dutch, and English.

== Career ==
At the age of seven Fleur Bremmer landed her first small roles in commercials. Bremmer's first appearances were in short films and productions featuring young actors. In 2023, she starred in the short film "In the Tall Grass." In 2024, she had a role in the German feature film "Landesverräter" (Traitor to the Land) as "Ingrid Schmidt." She gained international attention in 2025 through her casting in the US film "Nuremberg," where she portrayed Edda Göring, the daughter of Nazi war criminal Hermann Göring. Although the film was shot in 2024, when she was only 9 years old, the film celebrated its world premiere on 7 September 2025, as part of the gala presentations at the Toronto International Film Festival 2025. Bremmer is currently (2026) filming in London for episodes of the Ted Lasso TV-series

== Acting credits ==
=== Film ===
Year	Title	Role	Notes	Ref.
2023	In the Tall Grass (short film)			
2024	Landesverräter (Traitor to the Land)	Ingrid Schmidt		
2025	Nuremberg	Edda Goering		
2025	Schwarzmoll (short film)			

=== Television ===
Year	Title	Role	Notes	Ref.
2025	Ted Lasso			
