= Herybert Menzel =

Fascist poet

- Born: 10 August 1906; Obornik, Province of Posen, German Empire
- Died: February 1945 (aged 38); Reichsgau Wartheland, Greater German Reich
- Education: Law
- Alma mater: Silesian Friedrich Wilhelm University in Breslau; FWU Berlin
- Organization: Reichsverband deutscher Schriftsteller
- Political party: Nazi Party
- Movement: Fascism
- Writing career
- Occupation: Poet
- Language: German
- Period: 20th century
- Military career
- Allegiance: Third Reich
- Branch: Sturmabteilung (c. 1933-1941); Volkssturm (1945)
- Rank: Sturmbannführer
- Service number: 1,043,489
- Battles: Battle of France; Vistula–Oder offensive

Herybert Menzel (10 August 1906 – February 1945) was a German poet and writer in Nazi Germany as well as a member of the Bamberg poet circle. He was killed in action in the final months of the Second World War.

== Life ==
Menzel was born in Obornik, the son of a postal secretary and grew up in the town of Tirschtiegel in the Prussian Partition of Poland (now Trzciel, Poland). After earning his Abitur in Crossen an der Oder he studied two semesters of law at the Silesian Friedrich Wilhelm University in Breslau and the Friedrich Wilhelm University of Berlin. He then settled in his hometown as a freelance writer. In 1926 he published his first independent publication, the volume of poetry Mond, Sonne und Stern und Ich. Kleine Lieder.

The tensions between Poles and Germans in the Greater Poland and Gdańsk Pomerania regions (then officially the provinces of Posen and West Prussia) shaped his artistic work. Menzel described this conflict-laden atmosphere in his home region in the works Grenzmärkische sagas (1929), Der Grenzmark-Rappe. Grenzmärkische sagas, stories, ballads and poems (1933) as well as in his first novel Controversial Earth (1930). The latter was produced in several editions with a total of at least 56,000 copies by 1943.

It is aesthetically, but also ideologically, a simply knitted text that uses an undemanding friend-foe dichotomy. It takes place around 1918/20, towards the end of the First World War and in the following twelve months, in the province of Poland and deals with the conflict between the previous German ruling class and their opponent, the Polish population. The concrete historical reference point is the […] Greater Poland uprising (1918–1919).

Already before 1933, Menzel joined the Nazi Party (membership number 1,043,489) and the Sturmabteilung, its paramilitary organization, attaining the rank of SA-Sturmbannführer in 1943. After the Nazi seizure of power, Menzel was best known for his poems, songs, and cantatas. In October 1933, he was one of the 88 writers who gave the Gelöbnis treuester Gefolgschaft (oath of loyal allegiance) to Adolf Hitler. Poems in his volume of poetry In March Step of the SA (1933) contributed to his reputation as the "Homer of the SA". His productions found their way into mass media literature as propaganda contributions:

Vorm Bild des Führers
Wenn ich nur zweifle, schau ich auf dein Bild,
Dein Auge sagt mir, was allein uns gilt.
So manche Stunde sprech ich wohl mit dir,
Als wärst du nah und wüßtest nun von mir.
Wo immer einer still wird vor der Tat,
Er kommt zu dir, du bester Kamerad.
In deinem Antlitz steht es ernst und rein,
Was es bedeutet, Deutschlands Sohn zu sein.

Menzel published in the Nazi Party newspaper Völkischer Beobachter, in the series "Junge Volk" and contributed to the Hitler Youth yearbook "The young team". On the occasion of the 6th anniversary of Horst Wessel 's death in 1936 he wrote the cantata "Ewig lives the SA", which was performed on 23 February 1936 in 739 cities of the German Reich. From 1933 to 1935 he was a board member of the Reich Association of German Writers. At the 29 March 1936 parliamentary election, he was elected to the Reichstag as a deputy from electoral constituency 5 (Frankfurt an der Oder) and served a single term until April 1938. In 1938, he became a member of the Bamberg Poets' Circle.

During his first tour of military service for the Third Reich, Menzel suffered such serious injuries in France in June 1940 that he had to be treated in hospitals for almost a year and after his service in a convalescent hospital. He was finally discharged from military service in November 1941. Menzel now fully devoted himself to his work as a freelance writer and now also wrote dramatic and prose texts as well as a chamber play. In his last published volume of poetry, Anders kehren wir wieder (1943), Menzel's disparaging, inhuman attitude towards the Slavic (especially Polish) population is revealed again. This becomes clear, for example, from the following verses, which refer to Warsaw, which was occupied by the Wehrmacht, and its inhabitants.

[…] Da das Feuer schon Ruß ward, / Der Leichendunst sich verzog, das Überlebende / Schon wieder schachert und lacht und lüstet / Und alles dies leugnet; rot sind die Münde, / Die Gier wuchert im Grauen; dies war reif, / O, überreif zur Verdammnis. […] / […], wir zwingen zum / Gleichschritt wieder uns alle, wir Sieger. / Stiefel, bestaubter, durch Staub weiter! Du triffst / Nichts, was verworfen nicht war.

The writer also carried out propaganda in the service of the Nazi regime on his lecture tours to Norway (1941) and Bulgaria (1942). Poems by him found their way into the flag and battle slogans of the Hitler Youth.

It can be assumed that Menzel was drafted into the Volkssturm at the beginning of 1945 as a reaction to the Vistula–Oder offensive of the Red Army and died in battle in Tirschtiegel. An exchange of letters shows that in 1946 Menzel's mother, for fear of an upcoming house search, consented to the burning of her son's estate, which also contained unpublished writings.

After the end of the Nazi regime, his writings were placed on the "List of Literature to be Excluded" in the Soviet Occupation Zone and in the German Democratic Republic.

Jan-Pieter Barbian counts Menzel to the guard of Nazi apologists ... who expressed the political guidelines of those in power in and with their works.

Menzel was a close friend of the Siewert sisters, the painter Clara Siewert and especially the writer Elisabeth Siewert, after whose death in 1930 he wrote an obituary in the Ostdeutsche Monatshefte.

A poem by Menzel with the title "Der Kamerad" was used by Konrad Kujau as an alleged Hitler poem in the context of the Hitler diaries forged by him.

== Honours ==
- 1938: Literaturpreis der Reichshauptstadt Berlin (3rd place, for Gedichte der Kameradschaft)
- 1939: Proceeds from the Harry Kreismann Foundation
- 1940: SA Culture Prize (for Menzels complete works)

== Writings ==
- Mond und Sonne und Stern und ich. Kleine Lieder, 1926
- Im Bann. Gedichte, 1930
- Umstrittene Erde, Roman, 1930
- Franz Lüdtke, der ostdeutsche Mensch und Dichter, 1932
- Der Grenzmark-Rappe. Grenzmärkische Sagen, Erzählungen, Balladen und Gedichte, 1933
- Im Marschschritt der SA. Gedichte, 1933
- Wir sind der Sieg!, 1934
- Die große Ernte. Kantate, 1935
- Das große Gelöbnis. Eine Kantate, 1935
- In unsern Fahnen lodert Gott. Kantate, 1935
- Gedichte der Kameradschaft, 1936
- Wenn wir unter Fahnen stehen. Lieder der Bewegung, 1938
- Alles Lebendige leuchtet. Gedichte eines Jahrzehnts, 1938
- Deutschland, heiliges Deutschland! Das große Gelöbnis, 1938
- Ewig lebt die SA. Eine Feier, 1938
- Herrn Figullas Schaufenster. Heitere Geschichten, 1941
- Das Siebengestirn, Roman, 1942
- Das Friedensschiff. Satire in 3 Akten, 1943
- Anders kehren wir wieder. Gedichte, 1943
- Noch einmal Napoleon? Komödie, 1943
- Einführung in Hermann Harz, Das Erlebnis der Reichsautobahn. Ein Bildwerk, Widmung: „Dem Schöpfer der Reichsautobahnen Reichsminister Dr. Fritz Todt zum Gedächtnis." Vorwort Albert Speer. Hg. Reichsministerium Speer, Georg D. W. Callwey, o. J. (1943) München
- Der Brief. Ein Kammerspiel in 3 Akten, 1944

== Sounces ==
- Lisa Lader, Wulf Segebrecht: Herybert Menzel. In: Der Bamberger Dichterkreis 1936–1943. Peter Lang, Frankfurt (Main) 1987 ISBN 3-8204-0104-0 S. 192–197
- Hans Sarkowicz, Alf Mentzer: Literatur in Nazi-Deutschland. Ein biografisches Lexikon., erw. Neuausgabe, Europa, Hamburg 2002, S. 309–311
- Erich Stockhorst: 5000 Köpfe. Wer war was im 3. Reich. Arndt, Kiel 2000, ISBN 3-88741-116-1 (Unveränderter Nachdruck der ersten Auflage von 1967).
- Rolf Düsterberg: Tod und Verklärung. Der NS-Propagandadichter Herybert Menzel. Internationales Archiv für Sozialgeschichte der deutschen Literatur IASL, 35 (2010), H. 2, Verlag Walter de Gruyter, Berlin 2010 ISSN 0340-4528; elektronisch: ISSN 1865-9128
- Rolf Düsterberg: Herybert Menzel – der Sänger der „ostmärkischen SA“. In: Derselbe (Hrsg.): Dichter für das „Dritte Reich“, Bd. 2, Aisthesis, Bielefeld 2011 ISBN 978-3-89528-855-5 S. 143–173
