= Hitler: Speeches and Proclamations =

Series of books edited by Max Domarus

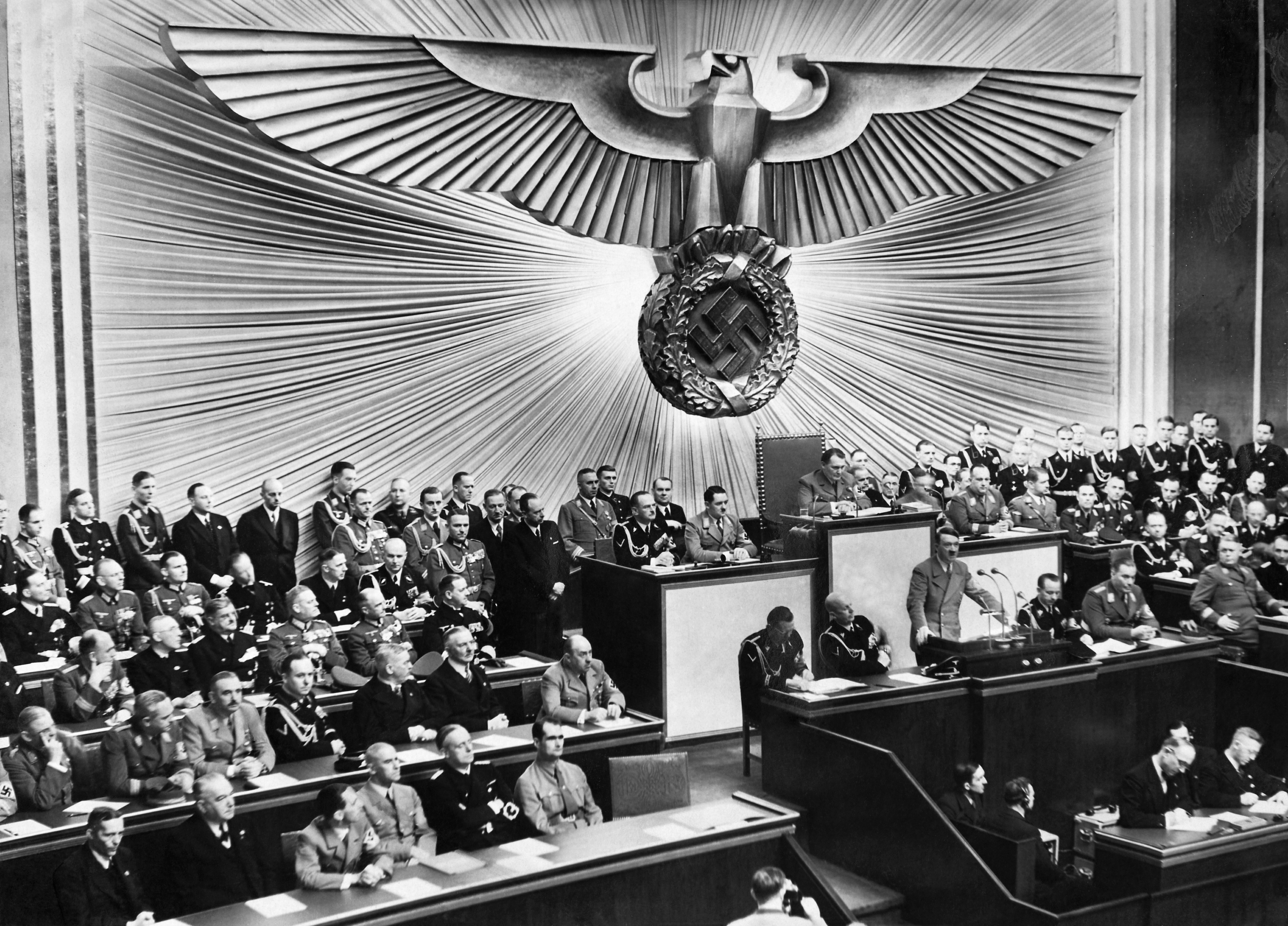
German Chancellor Adolf Hitler (standing at lectern) delivering a speech at the Reichstag on the 'Jewish question,' threatening the annihilation of European Jewry should another war break out, 30 January 1939.

Hitler: Speeches and Proclamations 1932–1945: The Chronicle of a Dictatorship is a 3,400-page book series edited by Max Domarus presenting the day-to-day activities of Adolf Hitler between 1932 and 1945, along with the text of significant speeches.

It was first published in German as Hitler: Reden und Proklamationen, 1932-1945 in two volumes in 1962–1963 by Schmidt Neustadt an der Aisch (Würzburg; republished in 1988 by Bolchazy-Carducci Publishers, ISBN 0-86516-329-4 [4 vol. set], ISBN 0-86516-325-1 [vol. I], ISBN 0-86516-326-X [vol. II], ISBN 0-86516-327-8 [vol. III], ISBN 0-86516-328-6 [vol. IV]). Bolchazy-Carducci Publishers, Inc. (Wauconda, Illinois) published a translation by Mary Fran Gilbert and Chris Wilcox in four hardcover volumes (ISBN 0-86516-228-X [4 vol. set]): Volume One The Years 1932 to 1934 (612 pages, 1990, ISBN 0-86516-227-1); Volume Two The Years 1935 to 1938 (756 pages, 1992, ISBN 0-86516-229-8); Volume Three The Years 1939 to 1940 (962 pages, 1997, ISBN 0-86516-230-1); Volume Four The Years 1941 to 1945 (1,070 pages, 2004, ISBN 0-86516-231-X).

== Contents ==
=== Volume One ===
- List of Photographs
- Abbreviations
- Preface
- Introduction
- Hitler's Personality
- Manner and Mental State
- From 'Artist' to 'God-Man'
- Political Aims
- 'Patriotism'
- Anti-Semitism
- Domestic Policy
- Foreign Policy
- The Methodology of Hitler's Oratory
- Remarks on the Structure of this Work

==== The Year 1932—The Bid for Power ====
- Major Events in Summary
- Report and Commentary
1. The Speech before the Industry Club
2. Candidacy for the Office of Reich President
3. Landtag Election Campaigns
4. Reichstag Elections of July 31
5. Reichstag Elections of November 6
6. The Final Steps toward Taking Power
7. The Speech after the Industry Club

==== The Year 1933—The National Revolution ====
- Major Events in Summary
- Report and Commentary
1. Hitler's Appointment as Reich Chancellor— Statement of Policy
2. The Consolidation of Power— Emergency Decrees
3. The Enabling Act— Debate between Hitler and Wels
4. The Beginning of the Gleichschaltung, of the Boycott against Jews and of the NS Foreign Policy
5. Elections in Danzig— The Concordat— First Reich Party Congress in Nuremberg— Withdrawal from the League of Nations
6. Commemoration March to the Feldherrnhalle— Beginning of Rearmament

==== The Year 1934—The Despot Unmasked ====
Major Events in Summary Report and Commentary

1. Ten-Year Pact between Germany and Poland
2. The "Reconstruction of the Reich"
3. The Röhm Purge
4. Hitler's Justification of the Slaughter of June 30
5. National Socialist Putsch Attempt in Austria— Hindenburg's Death— Oath of Allegiance to the 'Führer und Reichskanzler'
6. Plebiscite on Uniting the Offices of Chancellor and President
- Notes

=== Volume Two ===
==== The Year 1935—Laying the Foundations ====
- Major Events in Summary
- Report and Commentary
1. The Saar Plebiscite
2. From the Reintroduction of General Conscription to the Military Service Act
3. Anglo-German Naval Agreement— The Party Congress of Freedom and the Nuremberg Laws
4. The Swastika Flying over Germany

==== The Year 1936—Maneuvers ====
- Major Events in Summary
- Report and Commentary
1. A Wolf in Sheep's Clothing
2. The Occupation of the Rhineland
3. Election Campaigns
4. "Peace Speech"— German-Austrian Agreement— Involvement in Spain— Olympic Games
5. Lloyd George's Visit— Party Congress of Honor— Pacts with Italy and Japan

==== The Year 1937—Lull Before the Storm ====
- Major Events in Summary
- Report and Commentary
1. Accounting
2. Visions of the Future
3. Party Congress of Labor
4. Il Duce Visits Germany
5. Top Secret Steps on the Road to War— The Hossbach Minutes

==== The Year 1938—Grossdeutschland ====
- Major Events in Summary
- Report and Commentary
1. The Wehrmacht Crisis— Hitler Takes on the Supreme Command
2. Theatrics at the Berghof— Marathon Speech before the Reichstag
3. The Anschluss
4. The "Case Green" Study— The Führer Visits Italy
5. Targeting Czechoslovakia
6. Party Congress of Greater Germany
7. On the Eve of War
8. The Munich Agreement
9. Annexation Plans for the Remainder of Czechoslovakia— Kristallnacht
- Résumé
- Appendix
- Hitler's Rise to Supreme Commander of the Wehrmacht

=== Volume Three ===
==== The Year 1939—Under the Sign of Mars ====
- Major Events in Summary
- Report and Commentary
1. The New Reich Chancellery Building— Speech at the Kroll Opera House
2. Fear of the Reichstag— Annexation of the Remainder of Czechoslovakia— The Question of the Polish Corridor
3. Reunification with the Memel Territory— Directive for "Case White"
4. Roosevelt's Position and Hitler's Answer in the Reichstag
5. The "Pact of Steel" with Italy— War Appeal to the General Staff
6. The last "Culture Speech"— Economic Agreement and Pact of Non-Aggression with Russia— Britain's Diplomatic Efforts
7. Anglo-Polish Agreement— Mussolini's Reluctance— The Dahlerus Mission— British Memorandum
8. German Offer to Poland— War— Reichstag Speech
9. The British Answer— War Appeals and Directives by the Führer
10. Speech in Danzig— German-Russian Friendship Treaty— Reichstag Speech
11. War Aims in the West— Speech at the Bürgerbräukeller and Assassination Attempt— Appeal to the Commanders in Chief of the Wehrmacht

==== The Year 1940—The Sickle Cutting ====
- Major Events in Summary
- Report and Commentary
1. The "Study N"—Speech at the Hofbräuhaus
2. Foreign Visitors—Reichskommissariat in Norway
3. Appeal to Officer Cadets— The Western Offensive
4. The Fall of France— Directive for "Operation Sea Lion"
5. "War Speeches" in the Reichstag and the Sportpalast
6. Balkan Satellite States— The Battle of Britain— Tripartite Pact with Italy and Japan— Meetings with Benito Mussolini, Francisco Franco, and Philippe Pétain— Speech at the Bürgerbräukeller
7. Additional War Aims— Molotov's Visit— Directives for "Operation Attila" and "Case Barbarossa"— Speeches before Armament Workers and Officer Cadets

=== Volume Four ===
==== The Year 1941—The March East ====
- Major Events in Summary
- Report and Commentary
1. Final Victory Soon!— Plans for Invasion of Russia— Finishing Blow to War— Japanese-German Cooperation— Coup in Yugoslavia— German Response
2. Preparing for the Russian Campaign— Commissars Order— Invasion of Balkans
3. Rudolf Hess Flees to England— Start of Operation Barbarossa
4. East Front Stalls— Declaration of War Against United States
5. East Front Reverses— Battle of Moscow

==== The Year 1942—Political Military Failure ====
- Major Events in Summary
- Report and Commentary
1. Victory through Determination— Remembering Dr. Todt
2. Main War Objective— Elimination of Jews in Europe— Labor and Law— Hitler Supreme Law Lord
3. Eastern Offensive Resumes— Military Operations Become Confused
4. Hitler's appeal for War Winter Relief— Victory for Have Nots Imminent
5. Battle of Alamein— Announcement of Victory at Stalingrad— Stalingrad Surrounded— Mediterranean Difficulties

==== The Year 1943—The Empire Crumbles ====
- Major Events in Summary
- Report and Commentary
1. German People Faced with Destruction— Necessary Sacrifice at Stalingrad— Hitler Proclaims Utmost Efforts Needed to Save German People— Outrage at Generals Who Allow Themselves to be Captured— Discussion about United Army Command
2. Hitler Travels to Eastern Front— Air War Awards for Civilians Under Bombardment— Diplomatic Discussions with Mussolini, Horthy, and Tiso
3. The End in Africa— Drum Head Court Martial Trials— Fall of Italian Fascist Government— Measures to Concentrate War Economy— German Occupation of Italy
4. Hitler Speaks over Radio, Explains Reasons for War— Mussolini Rescued— Speech at Löwenbräukeller— Tide Turns Against Germany's Enemies— Zhitomir Operation— Considerations Regarding Defense of the West

==== The Year 1944—Catastrophe ====
- Major Events in Summary
- Report and Commentary
1. Germany Must Win the War Radio Speech— Strength of National Socialist State and Its Community Shall Prevail— Hitler Threatens Horthy Because He Protects Hungary's Jews
2. Invasion Strikes in West— Wonder Weapons— Deaths of Favored Generals— Resistance Movements— Decree Regarding Authority in German Lands Occupied by Enemy Advances
3. Assassination Attempt— Hitler Reacts to Resistance Movements— Courts of Honor Set Up to Judge July 20 plotters— Speech at Wolfsschanze for Party Leaders
4. Hitler's Allies Fall Away— Total Deployment by All German Human Beings— Horthy Removed— New German Offensive to Sweep Away Enemies in West— Speech at Ziegenberg, Reds Will Control Europe if We Lose

==== The Year 1945—Annihilation ====
- Major Events in Summary
- Report and Commentary
1. Germany Betrayed— East Front Disaster— Radio Speech, Firm Will and Almighty Shall Save Germany— German Forces Collapse in Face of Invasion East and West— Decree Regarding Demolition in German Territory
2. Eva Braun Comes to Bunker— Women in Hitler's Life— Death of Franklin Roosevelt— Final Days in Bunker Begin— Hitler Chooses Dönitz as Successor— Hitler's Marriage— Hitler's Last Testament— Suicide— Succession— Surrender
- Epilogue
- Hitler and History
- Hitler and the Question of War Guilt
- Hitler's Victories and Defeats in World War II
- Hitler's Stays Abroad
- Führer Headquarters
- Ships Mentioned in the Text
- Afterword
- Notes
- Bibliography
- Notes from the American Editor
- Documentary Works
- Reference Works
- General Works
- Index

== See also ==
- List of Adolf Hitler books
- List of Adolf Hitler speeches
