= Reichsverband deutscher Schriftsteller =

The Reichsverband deutscher Schriftsteller (sometimes mis-translated Nazi Writers Union) was founded in 1933 by the Nazi government of the Third Reich in the process of 'germanizing' cultural institutions and purging it of foreign influences. This process was necessitated by the Reichskulturkammergesetz (National Cultural Chamber Act) of 9 September 1933.

It encompassed writers of all literary genres, and was part of a larger literary hierarchy, the Reichsschrifttumkammer (Reich Writers' Chamber), founded the same year. The Reich Writers Chamber was one of seven components of the Reich Cultural Chamber.
