= Edda Göring =

Daughter of Hermann Göring (1938–2018)

- Edda wearing a specially designed military uniform, June 1942
- Born: Edda Carin Wilhelmine Göring; 2 June 1938; Berlin, Germany
- Died: 21 December 2018 (aged 80); Munich, Germany
- Education: Ludwig-Maximilians-Universität München
- Occupation: Law clerk
- Parents: Hermann Göring (father); Emmy Sonnemann (mother)
- Relatives: Heinrich Ernst Göring (grandfather); Albert Göring (uncle)

Edda Carin Wilhelmine Göring (2 June 1938 – 21 December 2018) was the only child of Hermann Göring and his second wife Emmy Sonnemann.

Born the year before the outbreak of the Second World War, Edda spent most of her early childhood years with her mother at the Göring family estate at Carinhall. As a child she received many historical works of art as gifts, including a painting of the Madonna and Child by Lucas Cranach the Elder.

In the final stages of the war, she and her mother moved to their mountain home at Obersalzberg, near Berchtesgaden. After the war, she went to a girls-only school, studied at the Ludwig-Maximilians-Universität München, and became a law clerk. In the 1950s and 1960s many of the valuable gifts she received as a child, including the Madonna and Child painting, became the subject of long legal battles, most of which she eventually lost in 1968.

Unlike the children of other high-ranking Nazis, such as Gudrun Himmler and Albert Speer Jr., Göring did not speak in public about her father's career. However, in 1986 she was interviewed for Swedish television and spoke lovingly of both her parents.

== Early life ==
Edda Carin Wilhelmine Göring was born on 2 June 1938, the only child of Hermann Göring. "Tributes came in from all over the world, including telegrams from [British] Lords Halifax and Londonderry." The historian Giles MacDonogh later described the German reaction to the birth:

The Reich was jubilant on 2 June. Its first lady, Emmy Göring, gave birth to a baby girl. The child was named Edda. The actress was 45, and her husband had been shot in the groin during the Beer Hall Putsch, so there was talk of virgin birth. When Hermann came to pick up his wife and child from the sanatorium 10 days later, the streets were black with cheering crowds.

It has often been suggested that the name Edda was given in honour of the daughter of Benito Mussolini, but her mother stated that this was not so. On 4 November 1938, she was baptised at Carinhall, and Adolf Hitler became her godfather. The occasion was reported by Life, with many photographs of Göring, her parents and Hitler, who greatly enjoyed the event. Her baptism presents included two paintings by Lucas Cranach the Elder.

Göring grew up at Carinhall and like other daughters of high-ranking Nazi leaders and officials she was called Kleine Prinzessin ("Little Princess"). When she was one year old, the journalist Douglas Reed wrote in Life that she was "a sort of Nazi Crown Princess."

In 1940, the Luftwaffe paid for a small-scale replica of Frederick the Great's palace of Sanssouci to be built in an orchard at Carinhall for Göring to play in. Some 50 metres (200 feet) long, 7 metres (20 feet) wide, and 3.5 metres (10 feet) high, this had within it a miniature theatre, complete with stage and curtains, and was known as Edda-Schlösschen ("Edda's little palace").

In 1940, Der Stürmer magazine printed a story alleging that Göring had been conceived by artificial insemination. A furious Hermann, who already despised the editor, Julius Streicher, demanded action by Walter Buch, the supreme Nazi Party regulator, against him. Buch declared he was ready to "stop that sick mind once and for all," but Hitler intervened to save Streicher and the outcome was that he was stripped of some honors, but was allowed to go on publishing Der Stürmer from his farm near Nuremberg.

== 1945 and after ==
During the closing stages of the Second World War in Europe, Hermann retreated to his mountain home at Obersalzberg, near Berchtesgaden, taking Emmy and Edda with him. On 8 May 1945, Armistice in Europe Day, the German Wehrmacht surrendered unconditionally, and on 21 May, a few days before her seventh birthday, Göring was interned with her mother in the US-controlled Palace Hotel, code-named Camp Ashcan, at Mondorf in Luxembourg. By 1946, the two had been freed and were living at one of their own houses, Burg Veldenstein, in Neuhaus, near Nuremberg. There they were visited by the American officer John E. Dolibois, who described Göring as "a beautiful child, the image of her father. Bright and perky, polite and well-trained."

During the Nuremberg trials, Göring was allowed to visit her father in prison. He was found guilty of war crimes and was sentenced to death. Upon hearing that his daughter said she hoped "to meet her Daddy in heaven," Göring wept. On 15 October 1946, the night before his scheduled execution, Hermann committed suicide by swallowing a cyanide pill. By April 1946, Emmy and Edda Göring were living in a small house at Sackdilling.

In 1948, while living near Hersbruck with her mother and her aunt, Else Sonnemann, Göring entered the St Anna-Mädchenoberrealschule ("Saint Anne's High School for Girls") at Sulzbach-Rosenberg in Bavaria where she remained until gaining her Abitur. In November 1948, the family moved to Etzelwang to be nearer the school.

In 1949, Emmy faced legal problems regarding some valuable possessions and explained many of them as the property of Edda, then aged ten. After leaving school, Göring studied law at the Ludwig-Maximilians-Universität München and became a law clerk; she later worked for a doctor. A private letter from an unknown relative in 1959 stated that "the baby is now a young lady, slim, fair-haired and pretty. She lives with her mother on the 5th floor of a modern apartment block in the Munich city centre."

== Later life ==
In her later years, Göring worked in a hospital laboratory and was hoping to become a medical technician. She was a regular guest of Hitler's patron Winifred Wagner whose grandson, Gottfried Wagner, later recalled:

My aunt Friedelind was outraged when my grandmother again slowly blossomed as the first lady of right-wing groups and received political friends such as Edda Goering, Ilse Hess, the former National Democratic Party of Germany chairman Adolf von Thadden, Gerdy Troost, the wife of the architect and friend of Hitler, Paul Ludwig Troost, the British fascist leader Oswald Mosley, the Nazi film director Karl Ritter and the racialist author and former cultural leader of the Reich Hans Severus Ziegler.

Göring worked in a rehabilitation clinic in Wiesbaden and devoted herself to taking care of her mother, remaining with her until she died on 8 June 1973. After that, for five years in the 1970s, Göring was the companion of the Stern magazine journalist Gerd Heidemann. Heidemann had bought the yacht Carin II, which had been Hermann's, and according to Peter Wyden, "He charmed Edda, pretty, not married, and devoted to the memory of her father, the Reichsmarschall, and started an affair with her. Together, they ran social events aboard the boat. Much of the talk was of Hitler and the Nazis, and the guests of honor were weathered eyewitnesses of the hallowed time, two generals, Karl Wolff and Wilhelm Mohnke."

For some years Göring made public appearances, attending memorials for Nazis and taking part in political events, but she later became more withdrawn. Unlike the children of other high-ranking Nazis, such as Gudrun Himmler and Albert Speer, Jr., she never commented publicly on her father's role in the Third Reich or the Holocaust. In the 1990s, she said of her father in an interview:

I loved him very much, and it was obvious how much he loved me. My only memories of him are such loving ones, I cannot see him any other way. I actually expect that most everybody has a favorable opinion of my father, except maybe in America. He was a good father to me.

In 2010, Göring said of her uncle Albert Göring for an article in The Guardian, "He could certainly help people in need himself financially and with his personal influence, but, as soon as it was necessary to involve higher authority or officials, then he had to have the support of my father, which he did get."

The governments of West Germany and the reunited Germany denied Edda Göring the pension normally given to the children of government ministers of the old German Reich. In 2015, she was reported to be still living in Munich. That year, she unsuccessfully petitioned the Landtag of Bavaria for compensation with respect to the expropriation of her father's legacy. A committee unanimously denied her request.

She died on 21 December 2018, aged 80, and was buried at an undisclosed location in the Munich Waldfriedhof. She neither married nor had children.

== Legal dispute over Cranach Madonna ==
At the time of her baptism in November 1938, Göring received several works of art as gifts, including a painting of the Madonna and Child by Lucas Cranach the Elder, a present from the City of Cologne. Part of an official collection entrusted to the office of the Oberbürgermeister (or Lord Mayor), the painting had been previously on display in the Wallraf-Richartz Museum in Cologne. The mayor at the time, Karl Georg Schmidt, had been a member of the Nazi party since 1923 and was a political ally of Hermann Göring.

After the war, the City of Cologne sought the return of the painting, on the grounds that the gifts had been unwillingly given to Edda under pressure from her father. Advocate-General Philipp Auerbach, state commissioner for racial, religious and political persecution in Bavaria, was entrusted with the return of many art treasures that had been acquired by the Görings, and the legal battle over the Cranach Madonna lasted for 15 years. At the first hearing, in the regional court of Cologne, judgment was given for the city. Göring, who at the time was studying law, appealed this decision to the Higher Regional Court of Cologne, which in 1954 overturned the lower court. Historian Anna Sigmund reports that the appeal court "came to the conclusion that [Hermann] Göring had not exerted any pressure" and "on the contrary" the mayor of the day (Schmidt) had "tried to curry favor for the city of Cologne by giving away the Cranach painting". This was Edda Göring's second legal victory of 1954. She had already been successful in forcing the state of Bavaria to return to her jewellery valued at 150,000 Deutschmarks which it had seized.

The authorities continued to pursue the case of the Cranach painting, and in January 1968 the Federal Court of Justice of Germany in Karlsruhe gave a final judgment in favour of the City of Cologne. By that point, both the state of Bavaria and the Federal Republic of Germany had laid claim to the painting, which was returned to the Wallraf-Richartz-Museum.

== In popular culture ==
Edda Göring appears as a character in the 2000 Canadian-American television docudrama miniseries Nuremberg.

In the 1991 comedy-drama Selling Hitler she was played by Alison Steadman.

Edda Göring appears in the 2025 film Nuremberg portrayed by Fleur Bremmer.

Edda Göring is mentioned in a poem by Robert Pringle called "Stations of the Cross":

I start reading My Father's Keeper
to Edda Göring, who turns the blank pages.

== Sources ==
=== Printed ===
- Angolia, John (1989). For Führer and Fatherland: Political & Civil Awards of the Third Reich. R. James Bender. ISBN 978-0912138169.
- Bertz, Michael (2008). Looting and Restitution: Jewish-Owned Cultural Artifacts from 1933 to the Present. Wallstein Publishing. ISBN 978-3-8353-0361-4.
- Brockdorff, Werner (1969). Escape from Nuremberg: Plans and Organization of the Escape Routes of the Nazi Prominence.
- Manvell, Roger (2011). Goering. London: Skyhorse. ISBN 978-1-61608-109-6.
- MacDonogh, Giles (1998). 1938: Hitler's Gamble. London: Constable. ISBN 978-1-84529-845-6.
- Göring, Emmy (1972). My Life with Göring. London: David Bruce & Watson.
- Göring, Emmy (1967). On My Husbands Events and Confessions. Saxony: Gottingen.
- Guenther, Irene (2004). Fashioning Women in the Third Reich. Frankfurt am Main: Berg.
- Knopf, Stefan (2007). Goring's Reich: Self-dramatization in Carinhall. Berlin.
- Dolibois, John E. (2001). Pattern of Circles: an Ambassador's Story. Kent State University Press.
- Posner, Gerald L. (1991). Hitler's Children: Sons and Daughters of Leaders of the Third Reich. Random House. ISBN 9780394582993.
- Lippe, Viktor von der (1951). Nuremberg Diary Entries from November 1945 to October 1946. Berg, Frankfurt am Main: R. James Bender.
- Lebert, Stephan (2000). Because You Carry My Name: The Heavy Legacy of the Prominent Nazi Children. Munich: Karl Blessing Verlag.
- Lachenmann, Helmut (2002). Participants in a Mass Migration. Düsseldorf, Rhine-Ruhr.
- Sagstetter, Maria Rita (2001). Hermann Göring at Castle Veldenstein and Sackdilling. Bavaria, Munich.
- Sigmund, Anna Maria (2001). The Women of the Nazis. Bavaria, Munich.
- Wagner, Gottfried (2006). Our Zero Hour: Germans and Jews after 1945. Böhlau. ISBN 3-205-77335-7.
- Wyden, Peter (2001). The Hitler Virus: the Insidious Legacy of Adolf Hitler. Arcade. ISBN 1-55970-532-9.
- Klein, Adolf (1983). Cologne in the Third Reich. Cologne, North Rhine-Westphalia.
- Francini, Georg (2001). The transfer of Cultural Property in Switzerland and Over the Question of Restitution (1933–1945). Zurich, Canton of Zürich.
- Pringle, Robert (2008). Inventing God. Zurich, Canton of Zürich: Pudding House. ISBN 978-1-58998-657-2.

=== Online ===
- Burke, William Hastings (20 February 2010). "Albert Göring, Hermann's Anti-Nazi Brother". The Guardian.
- "Edda Göring: Madonna ohne Makel". Spiegel Online (in German). 8. Der Spiegel. 21 February 1962.
- Wittl, Wolfgang. "Göring-Tochter Fordert Geld vom Freistaat Zurück". Süddeutsche.de (in German). Süddeutsche Zeitung.
- "Government Keeps After Business; Nazis Cuss Roosevelt; A Gould Comes Out". Life. 14 November 1938.
