= Gerd Heidemann =

German journalist (1931–2024)

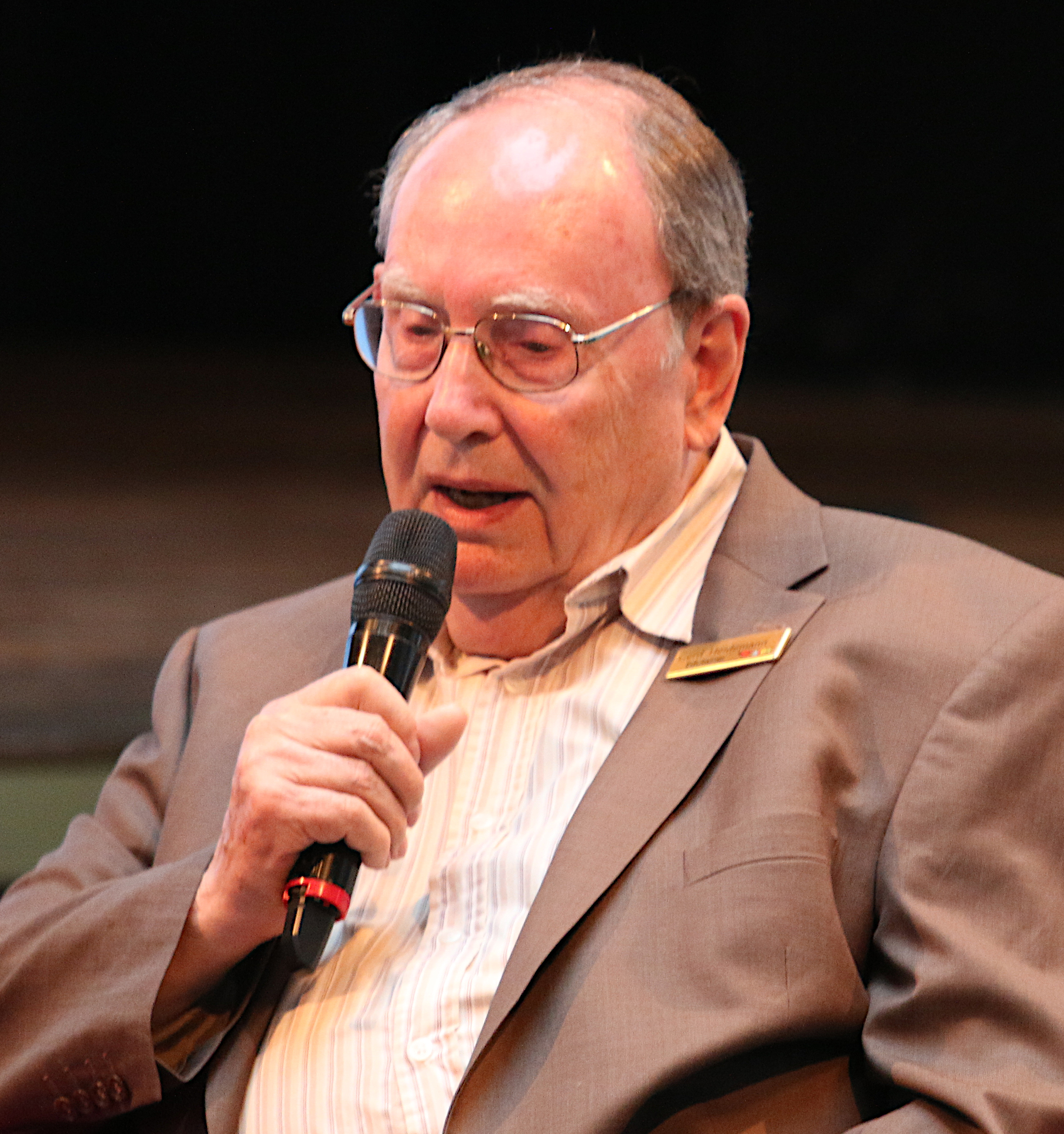
- Heidemann in 2017
- Born: 4 December 1931; Altona, Hamburg, Germany
- Died: 9 December 2024 (aged 93); Hamburg, Germany
- Occupation: Journalist
- Known for: Role in the publication of purported Hitler Diaries that were subsequently proved to be forgeries

Gerd Heidemann (4 December 1931 – 9 December 2024) was a German journalist best known for his role in the publication of purported Hitler Diaries that were subsequently proved to be forgeries, the work of Konrad Kujau.

== Biography ==
=== Early life and career ===
Born in Hamburg, Heidemann showed an early interest in photography, and began his career as a freelance photo journalist. He joined the permanent staff of the weekly magazine Stern in 1955. He proved to be a tenacious researcher and a determined traveller to exotic and dangerous locales, but a writer of limited ability. His early work included extensive research into the identity of author B. Traven.

In the 1970s, Heidemann bought the yacht Carin II, which had belonged to Hermann Göring, met his daughter Edda Göring and had an affair with her which lasted for five years. They entertained on the yacht and their guests included two Second World War generals, Karl Wolff and Wilhelm Mohnke.

=== Hitler diaries ===
Heidemann came forward with his story of lost diaries written by Adolf Hitler in 1983. He sold the rights to Stern for DM 10,000,000 (then approximately US$6 million), along with his tale about how they had been hidden in a barn in East Germany for many years. Several experts, including the British historian Hugh Trevor-Roper, came forward to pronounce the diaries to be authentic. The "diaries" were exposed as fabrications and Heidemann was fired from Stern just weeks later. Following the revelations, Heidemann was arrested, tried and sentenced in 1985 to four and a half years in prison for fraud. Heidemann had also stolen some of the money from Kujau; and kept $600,000 of the money from Stern to acquire the diaries. He was renting expensive residences, buying new cars and jewellery and buying more Nazi memorabilia, of which a great amount was more of Kujau's forgeries.

=== Later life and death ===
In 2002, Der Spiegel alleged that Heidemann had worked as a double-agent for the Stasi, and that the publication of the Hitler diaries had been part of a Soviet and East German plan to embarrass and discredit the Capitalist West. In the BBC Radio 4 programme The Reunion broadcast on 7 September 2008, Heidemann vehemently denied that he had ever been a spy for the Stasi.

By 2008, Heidemann was living in poverty in Hamburg, receiving a €350 monthly welfare payment. At the time he had extensive debt estimated to be €700,000. In 2013, Heidemann was lobbying for the return of the manuscripts citing a contractual obligation of Stern publisher Gruner + Jahr.

Heidemann died in Hamburg on 9 December 2024, at the age of 93.

After Heidemann's death, his collection of documents pertaining to World War II was acquired by the Hoover Institution Library and Archives at Stanford University. It contained, amongst other, nine never before published audiotapes of a 1979 meeting between Gestapo Chief Klaus Barbie and SS General Karl Wolff, in which they openly discussed their actions during the Nazi period. The recordings and photos of the meeting were made by Heidemann. In May 2025, the Dutch television documentary De Barbie Tapes showed how the tapes came about, how some of the war criminals lived their post-war life, and the documentary played the main quotes from the meeting between Barbie and Wolff.
