= Konrad Kujau =

German illustrator and forger (1938–2000)

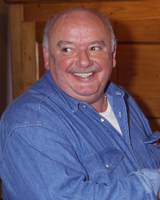
- Kujau in 1992
- Born: Konrad Paul Kujau; 27 June 1938; Löbau, Nazi Germany
- Died: 12 September 2000 (aged 62); Stuttgart, Germany
- Occupations: Illustrator; forger
- Known for: Forging the "Hitler Diaries"
- Website: kujau-archiv.de

Konrad Paul Kujau (27 June 1938 – 12 September 2000) was a German illustrator and forger. He became famous in 1983 as the creator of the so-called Hitler Diaries, for which he received DM 2.5 million (€2,421,020 in 2020 terms, adjusted for inflation) from a journalist, Gerd Heidemann, who in turn sold it for DM 9.3 million to the magazine Stern, resulting in a net profit of DM 6.8 million (€6,585,174 in 2020 terms, adjusted for inflation) for Heidemann. The forgery resulted in a four-and-half-year prison sentence for Kujau.

== Biography ==
=== Early life ===
"Konny" Kujau was born in Löbau, Nazi Germany, one of six children of Richard Kujau, a cobbler, and his wife, both of whom had joined the Nazi Party in 1933. Kujau's early life was of unremitting poverty and his mother was obliged to send her children into orphanages for periods of time. The boy grew up believing in the Nazi ideals and idolising Adolf Hitler; the defeat by the Allies in 1945, and Hitler's suicide, did not temper his enthusiasm for the Nazi cause. He held a series of menial jobs until 1957, when he was working as a waiter at the Löbau Youth Club, and a warrant was issued for his arrest in connection with the theft of a microphone. In June he fled to Stuttgart, West Germany, where he soon drifted into temporary menial work and petty crime.

In 1959 he was fined 80 Marks (DM) for stealing tobacco; in 1960 he was sent to prison for nine months after being caught breaking into a storeroom to steal cognac; in 1961 he spent more time in prison after stealing five crates of fruit. Six months later he was arrested after getting into a fight with his employer while working as a cook in a bar.

In 1961, he began a relationship with Edith Lieblang, one of the waitresses at the bar where he was working. The couple moved to Plochingen and opened a dance bar, which was a modest success. Kujau began to create a fictional background for himself, telling people his real name was Peter Fischer, changing his date of birth by two years, and altering the history of his time in East Germany. By 1963, the bar began suffering financial difficulties and the couple moved back to Stuttgart, where Kujau found work as a waiter. He also started his career as a counterfeiter, forging DM 27 worth of luncheon vouchers; he was caught and sentenced to five days in prison. On his release he and his wife formed the Lieblang Cleaning Company, although the company provided little income for them. In March 1968, at a routine check at Kujau's lodgings, the police established he was living under a false identity, after the name, address and date-of-birth details Kujau had provided to the police were different to those on the papers he was carrying at the time. At the police station he offered a third set of details, and a false explanation as to why he was masquerading under an assumed identity, but the subsequent fingerprint check confirmed he was Kujau. He was sent to Stuttgart's Stammheim Prison.

After his release in the late 1960s, the cleaning business became profitable enough for the couple to buy a flat in Schmieden, near Stuttgart. In 1970, Kujau visited his family in East Germany and found out that many of the locals held Nazi memorabilia, contrary to the laws of the Communist government. Kujau saw an opportunity to buy the material cheaply on the black market and make a profit in the West, where there was an increasing demand for such items. Prices among Stuttgart collectors were up to ten times the prices paid by Kujau. The trade was illegal in East Germany, and the export of what were deemed items of cultural heritage was banned. Both the Kujaus were stopped, although only once each, and their penalty was the confiscation of the contraband.

Among the items smuggled out of East Germany were weapons, and Kujau would occasionally wear a pistol, sometimes firing it in a nearby field, or shooting empty bottles in his local bar. One night in February 1973, while drunk, he took a loaded machine gun to confront a man he thought had been slashing the tyres of his cleaning company van. The man ran off and Kujau chased him into the wrong doorway, terrifying a prostitute. Her screams brought the police who arrested Kujau. When they searched his flat they found five pistols, a machine gun, a shotgun and three rifles. Kujau apologised and was given a fine.

In 1974, he rented a shop into which he placed his Nazi memorabilia. The outlet also became the venue for late-night drinking sessions with friends and fellow collectors, including Wolfgang Schulze, a resident of the US, who became Kujau's American agent. Kujau soon began to raise the value of items in his shop by forging additional authentication details, including for a genuine First World War helmet, worth a few marks, for which Kujau forged a note saying it had been Hitler's, worn in Ypres in late October 1914, thereby radically raising its value. In addition to notes by Hitler, he produced documents in the handwriting of Martin Bormann, Rudolf Hess, Heinrich Himmler, Hermann Göring and Joseph Goebbels. Although the handwriting was a passable imitation of the owners, the rest of the work was crude: Kujau used modern stationery, which he aged with tea, and created letterheads by using Letraset. In many cases the spelling and grammar was inaccurate, particularly when he forged documents in English, such as a copy of the Munich Agreement between Hitler and Neville Chamberlain, which he transcribed as:

"We regard the areement signet last night and the Anglo-German Naval Agreement as symbolic of the desire of our two peoples never to go to war with one another againe."

In the mid- to late-1970s Kujau, an able amateur artist, turned to producing paintings which he claimed were by Hitler, who had himself been an artist in his younger days. Having found a market for his forged works, Kujau painted subjects his buyers professed an interest in, such as cartoons, nudes and men in action — subjects that Hitler never painted, nor would want to paint. Often these paintings were accompanied by small notes purportedly from Hitler but forged by Kujau. The paintings proved profitable for the forger. To explain his access to the memorabilia, he invented several sources in East Germany, including a former Nazi general, the director of a museum whom he had bribed, and his brother, a general in the East German army.

Having found success in passing off his forged notes as those of Hitler, Kujau grew more ambitious, and copied, by hand, the text from both volumes of Mein Kampf, even though the originals were completed by typewriter. Kujau also produced an introduction to a third volume of the work. He sold these "manuscripts" to one of his regular clients, Fritz Stiefel, a collector of Nazi memorabilia. (Note: According to a later investigation by the Hamburg state prosecutor, Stiefel spent DM 250,000 buying memorabilia from Kujau. His obsession in obtaining paintings, notes, speeches, poems and letters purportedly from Hitler led to him defrauding his own company by DM 180,000.) Kujau also began forging a series of war poems by Hitler, which were so amateurish that Kujau later admitted that "a fourteen-year-old collector would have recognized it as a forgery". When some of those poems were published in 1980, one historian pointed out that one of them could not have been produced by Hitler because it had been written by Herybert Menzel.

=== Hitler diaries ===
It is unclear when Kujau produced his first Hitler diary. Stiefel says Kujau gave him a diary on loan in 1975. Schulze puts the date in 1976, while Kujau says he began in 1978. He used one of a pile of notebooks he had bought cheaply in East Berlin, and mistakenly put the letters FH (instead of AH) in gold on the front; these letters were purchased in a department store and made of plastic in Hong Kong. To add a further look of authentication, he took the black ribbon from a real SS document, and attached it to the cover using a German army wax seal. For the ink he purchased two bottles of Pelikan ink, one black and one blue, and mixed the two together with water so it flowed more easily from the cheap modern pen he used. Kujau had spent a month practising to write in the old German gothic script in which Hitler used to write. Kujau showed it to Stiefel who was impressed by the work, and wanted to buy it, but when the forger refused to sell it, he asked to borrow it instead, which was agreed upon.

In 1978 Kujau sold his first "Hitler Diary" to a collector. In 1980 he was contacted by the journalist Gerd Heidemann who had learned of the diary. Kujau told Heidemann that the diaries were in the possession of his brother, who was a general in the East German Army. Heidemann made a deal with Kujau for "the rest" of the diaries. Over the next two years Kujau faked a further 61 volumes and sold them to Heidemann for DM 2.5 million. Heidemann in turn received DM 9 million from his employers at Stern. On their publication in 1983, the diaries were soon proved to be fabrications, and Heidemann and Kujau were arrested. In August 1984, Kujau was sentenced to four and a half years for forgery and Lieblang to one year as an accomplice. Heidemann was convicted of fraud and also received a four-and-half year prison sentence the following year.

On his release from prison after three years, Kujau became something of a minor celebrity, appearing on TV as a "forgery expert", and set up a business selling "genuine Kujau fakes" in the style of various major artists. He stood for election as Mayor of Stuttgart in 1996, receiving 901 votes. Kujau died of stomach cancer in 2000.

In 2006, someone claiming to be his grandniece, Petra Kujau, was charged with selling "fake forgeries", cheap Asian-made copies of famous paintings with forged signatures of Konrad Kujau.

== Notes and references ==
=== Sources ===
- Hamilton, Charles (1991). The Hitler Diaries. Lexington, KT: The University Press of Kentucky. ISBN 978-0-8131-1739-3.
- Harris, Robert (1991) [1986]. Selling Hitler. London: Faber and Faber. ISBN 978-0-5711-4726-7.
